= Culture of Portland, Oregon =

== Art ==
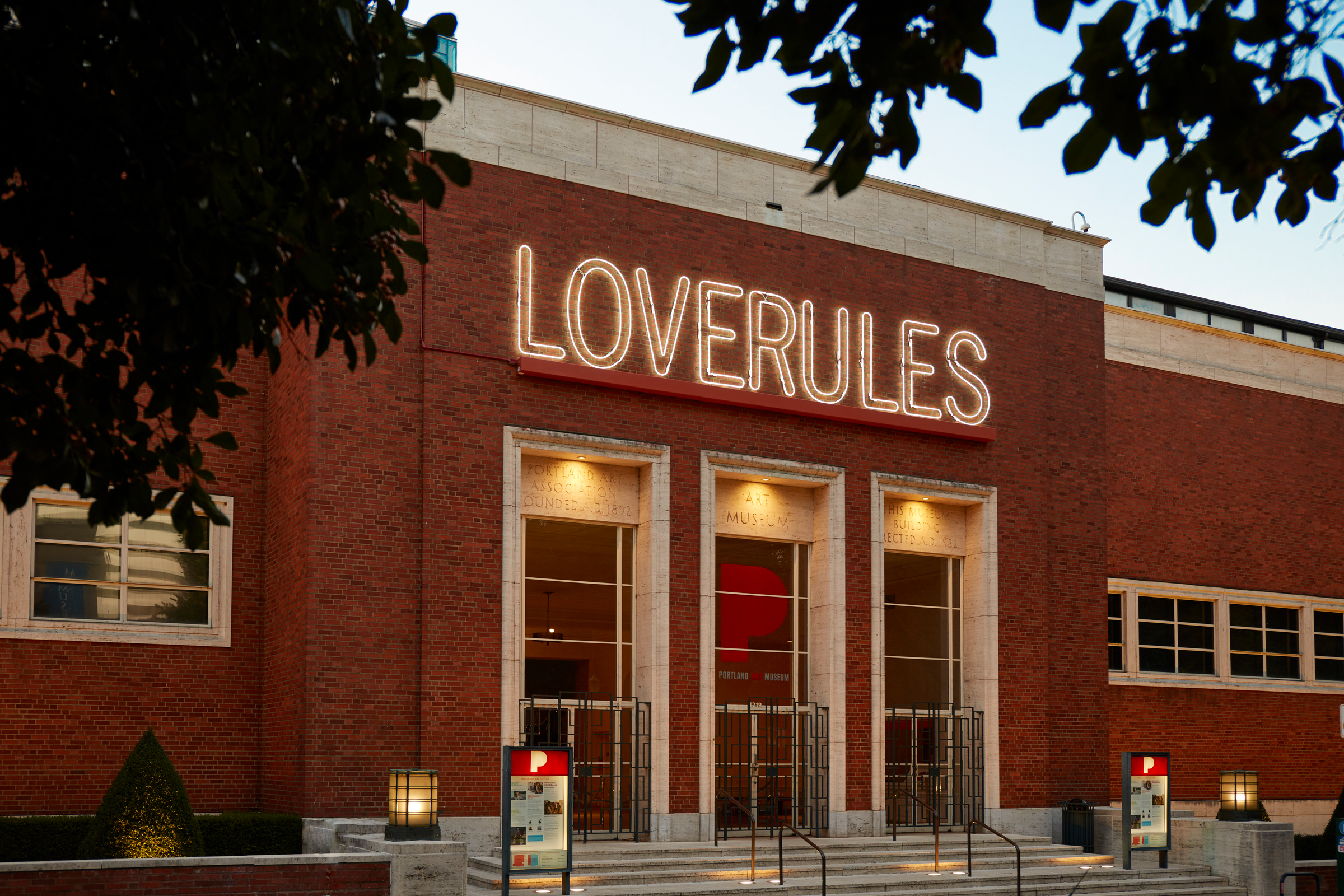
Exterior of the Portland Art Museum, 2019

Among annual art events is Art in the Pearl and the Portland Winter Light Festival. Art galleries and museums include the Blue Sky Gallery, the Portland Art Museum, the Portland Institute for Contemporary Art, and the Portland Museum of Modern Art. Immersive art experiences have included Dinolandia (2022), Time-Based Art Festival, Fathom, Hopscotch, Portland Aquarium, and Wonderwood.

=== Comics ===
KATU has said comics are "part of the city’s identity". According to Oregon Public Broadcasting, "Portland is known as one of the biggest hubs for independent comics creators." In 2026, Corbin Smith of the Portland Mercury called the city "a global hotbed for the production of comic books". Hundreds of comics artists worked in Portland in 2026, including Kelly Sue DeConnick, Rupert Kinnard, and Sarah Mirk. Rose City Comic Con hosts thousands annually. The Northwest Museum of Cartoon Arts operated during 2025 and 2026.

== Film ==
Annual film festival have included the Cascade Festival of African Films, GuignolFest, the Northwest Filmmakers' Festival, the Portland Documentary and Experimental Film Festival, the Portland Festival of Cinema, Animation & Technology, the Portland Film Festival, and the Portland Latin American Film Festival.

== Food and drink ==
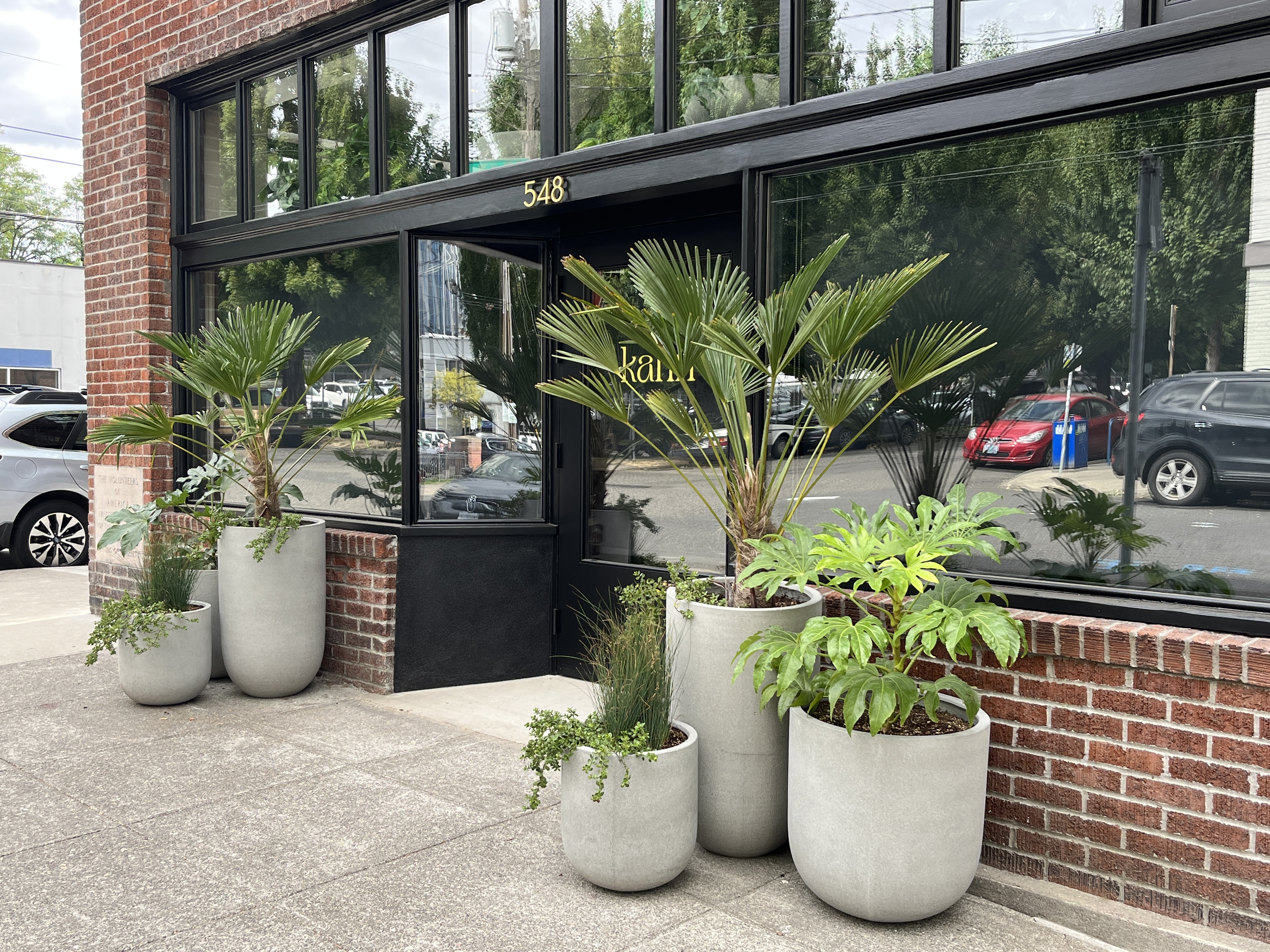
Kann (exterior pictured in 2022) received the James Beard Foundation Award for Best New Restaurant in 2023.

Portland has one of the nation's "finest" dining scenes, according to The New York Times. In 2025, the newspaper's Brian Gallagher said Portland "is the best food city of its size" in the U.S. Food & Wine named Portland the nation's "best food truck city" in 2023. The city hosted approximately 1,000 food carts at the time.

Annual food and drink events have included Bite of Oregon, Feast Portland, the Oregon Brewers Festival, Portland Fermentation Festival, Portland International Beerfest, the Portland Seafood and Wine Festival, and SheBrew.

The first annual Frybread Fest was held in 2024. The free event in downtown Portland featured frybread from Javelina, drumming, storytelling, and Portland Indigenous Marketplace vendors. Frybread Fest returned with food, music, and performances in 2025. The expanded 2026 event at Director Park is being hosted by Downtown Portland Clean and Safe and Miss Indian Northwest. It is slated to showcase cooking and crafts, as well as basket weaving, hide tanning, and salmon processing.

Portland has been recognized as one of the nation's best cities for vegans.

Kann received the James Beard Foundation Award for Best New Restaurant in 2023.

== Holidays ==
Various holidays are celebrated in Portland. Holidays with religious, cultural, or otherwise historical significance include Christmas, Easter, Independence Day, Indigenous Peoples' Day, Juneteenth, and Lunar New Year. The city also sees celebrations and activities for Earth Day, Halloween, Mardi Gras, Memorial Day, New Year's Eve, St. Patrick's Day, Thanksgiving, and Valentine's Day, among other holidays.

=== Religious holidays ===
==== Christmas ====
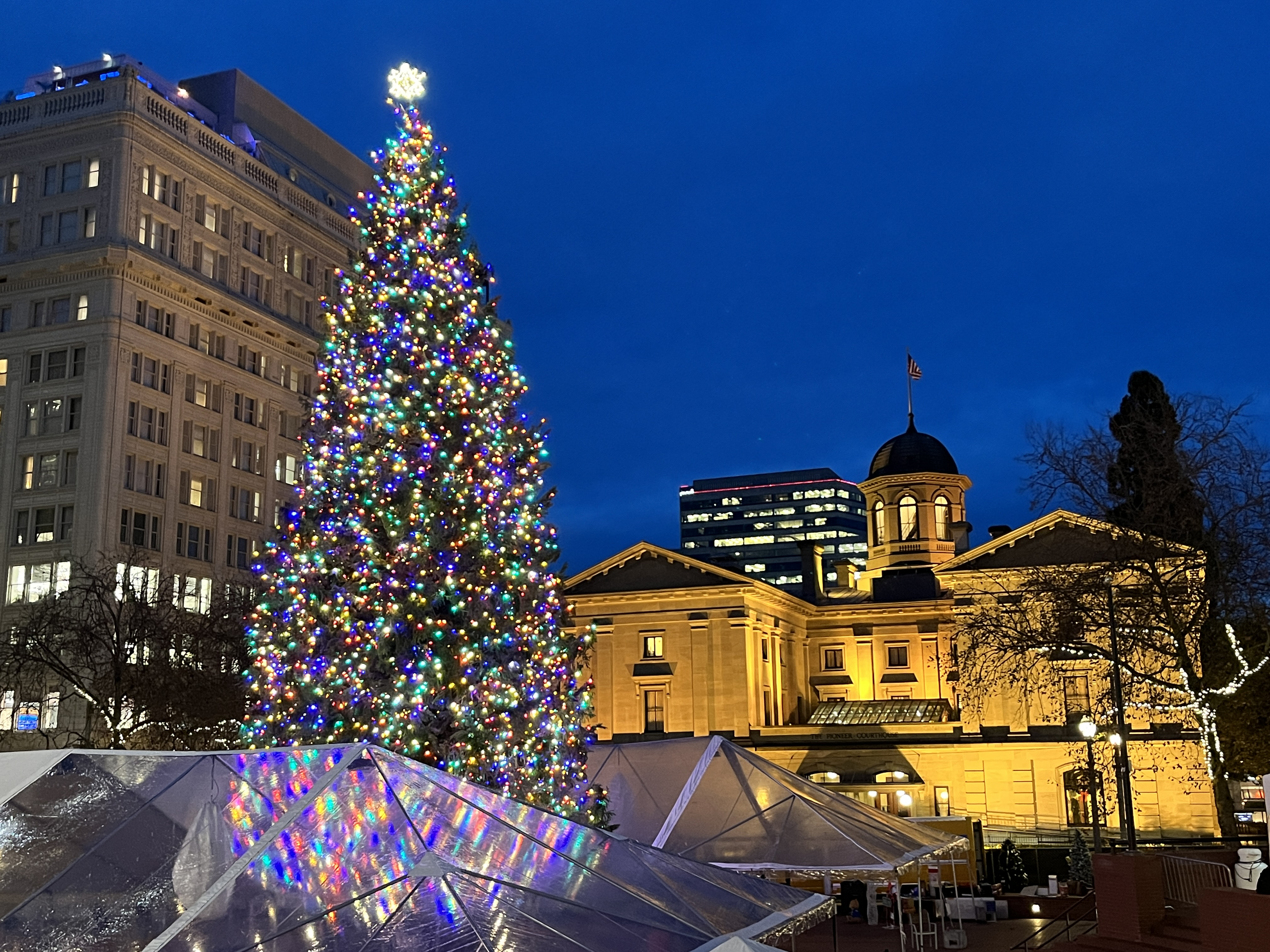
Pioneer Courthouse Square Christmas tree, 2024

There are many ways in which the Christian holiday of Christmas is celebrated in Portland. Annual traditions include the Christmas Ships Parade, Peacock Lane, the Pioneer Courthouse Square Christmas tree, the art installation Santa Clones, and Winter Wonderland, a light display held at Portland International Raceway since 1993. The city hosts many other displays, concerts, and other performances related to the holiday.

==== Diwali ====
The city has hosted various events and activities to commemorate the holiday Diwali; in 2023, Willamette Week said there were dozens of Diwali festivals planned in the Portland metropolitan area. The Portland Spirit has offered cruises on the Willamette River with Desi music. The Multnomah Athletic Club has also hosted festivities for the holiday.

In 2023, Dance United and DJ Prashant hosted a "multi-cultural celebration" for both Diwali and Día de los Muertos. The event at the T.E.A.M. Center featured a dance party, diyas, and ofrendas; food and drink options included tacos, chai, and Mexican hot chocolate. DJ Prashant also hosted "Desi Diwali Dance Party" at Lola's Room in the Crystal Ballroom. Northwest Children's Theater hosted Diwali celebrations featuring crafts and a diya dance tutorial. There was also intercommunity collaboration between the Jewish Federation of Greater Portland and a local affiliate of the Hindu volunteer organization Hindu Swayamsevak Sangh for Diwali. In 2024, Portland had a Diwali event with artist Renuluka Maharaj. A Diwali celebration was held at Pioneer Courthouse Square (PCS) in 2025.

In 2018, the Indian Student Association at Portland State University (PSU) hosted a Diwali celebration at Hoffman Hall; several members of the association performed Arti. The UP hosted Diwali celebrations in 2022 and 2023; the 2023 event was hosted by the South Asian Student Union in collaboration with Pilots After Dark at Pilot House. Approximately 200 people attended a Diwali celebration at Portland Community College's (PCC) Rock Creek Women's Resource Center in 2023. Students with the Indian Student Union have considered hosting festivities at Lincoln High School.

Sewa Diwali Oregon hosted a food drive in 2021. Local restaurants have offered Diwali specials, including East India Co. Grill and Bar in 2009. In 2023, Bhuna offered specials and displayed a small shrine to Hindu gods Ganesha and Lakshmi. Elsewhere in the metropolitan area, approximately 200 people from the city, Beaverton, Hillsboro, and Tigard celebrated Diwali at the Portland Balaji Temple in Hillsboro in 2014. The BAPS Temple in Tigard hosts one of the metropolitan area's largest and volunteer-organized Diwali events, attracting approximately 1,000 people annually. The event is usually attended by a group of students from Beaverton's Jesuit High School.

==== Easter ====
Easter is celebrated annually. The Christian holy day is represented by religious and secular Easter traditions and activities in the city, including costumed bar crawls, brunches, Easter Bunny appearances, and community Easter egg hunts.

==== Hanukkah ====
The Jewish holiday of Hanukkah is celebrated annually. Among annual events is the lighting of the public menorah at PCS, which has taken place since 1984. Hundreds gathered in 2022 and approximately 900 people attended the lighting ceremony in 2023. Approximately 500 people attended in 2025. The ceremony is hosted by the Chabad Center for Jewish Life. Public menorahs have also been displayed at Director Park and at Jamison Square in the Pearl District. Additionally, the annual ceremony for the lighting of PCS's Christmas tree has acknowledged Hanukkah; for example, the 2017 event included a rendition of "I Have a Little Dreidel".

In 2023, Congregation Neveh Shalom hosted the "Let It Glow Chanukah Festival", which featured cookie decorating, a dance party, games, handicraft, and other entertainment. There was also a "S'mores and Hanukkah Sing-a-long" at Leikam Brewing and a "Hanukkah Night Market" at Eastside Jewish Commons. On the last night of Hanukkah in 2023, Portland saw participation in a protest by shutting down the Burnside Bridge and lighting a 12-foot-tall menorah. The protest called for a ceasefire in Gaza. According to KPTV, the demonstration "was in coordination with Jewish Voice for Peace and other Jewish-led groups forming bridge blockades in several major cities across the United States".

In 2024, approximately 100 people from the local Jewish community celebrated the holiday by playing pickleball at People's Courts. In 2025, there was increased security for holiday events, following the Bondi Beach shooting. KGW said the Portland Police Bureau (PPB) "reached out to the Jewish Federation of Greater Portland to collaborate on how to address concerns and ensure community safety. Police will increase patrols in and around Jewish places of worship, schools and community centers, as well as various events celebrating the beginning of Hanukkah." A "Hanukkah Rave" was held at the Barrel Room, a bar in Downtown Portland. Other Hanukkah events in Portland in 2025 included the "Llamakkah" menorah lighting at Lewis & Clark College featuring donuts, latkes, and therapy llamas, a menorah lighting ceremony at Multnomah Village, and another lighting ceremony before a Portland Trail Blazers game.

Multnomah Athletic Club has hosted Hanukkah celebrations. Some local restaurants and grocery stores have offered specials for the holiday. Kachka hosts an annual Latke Party. Elephants Delicatessen and Zupan's Markets have also offered special food options. The defunct Sweet Lorraine's offered latkes and sufganiyot for the holiday.

==== Holi ====
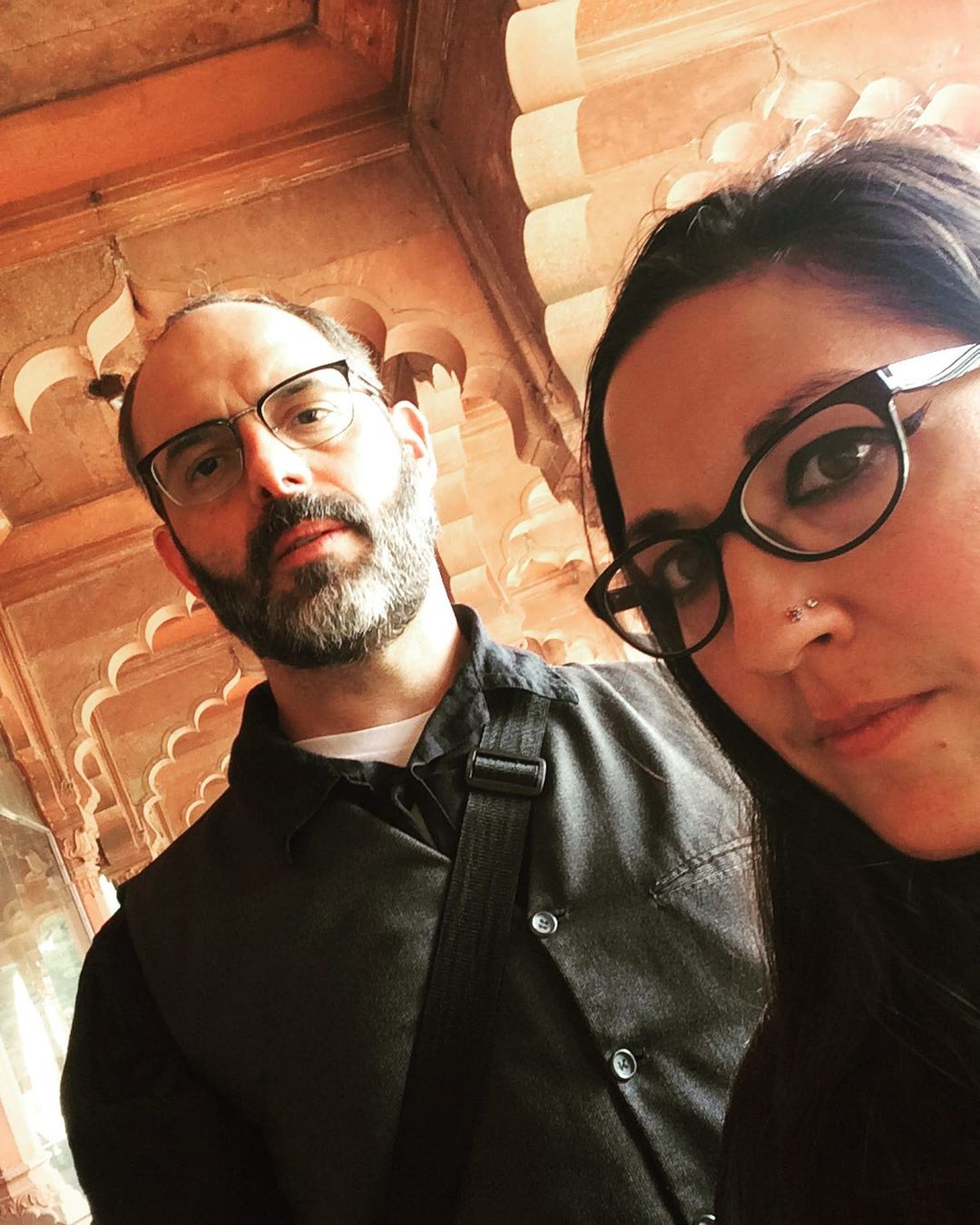
DJ Anjali and the Incredible Kid (pictured in 2020) performed at the Holi Spring Festival in 2022 and 2025.

Holi is celebrated annually. In 2017, Red Baraat, DJ Anjali and the Incredible Kid, and Ganavya performed at a Holi Hai celebration at Star Theater. There was a Holi celebration at White Owl Social Club in 2019; local authorities investigated a sexual assault that was reported after the daytime dance party. DJ Prashant and Bollywood Dreams Entertainment hosted a Holi celebration at Opaline in the Northwest Portland part of the Old Town Chinatown neighborhood in 2022. The event was attended by approximately 100 people. Hundreds of attended Portland Holi Hai in 2023.

The city's first official Holi festival at PCS in 2025 was attended by approximately 6,000 people. Previously, celebrations were held in suburbs, including Hillsboro. According to KPTV, "The smaller celebrations were limited by space and funds, but this year, Kakad was the recipient of the 'Scale Up' grant from Travel Portland and Prosper Portland, which funds local events to attract visitors from outside the city... The funds allowed him to run a massive two-day event at Pioneer Courthouse Square, complete with food vendors, performers, and more than quadruple the number of attendees." The family-friendly event in 2025 had a dance party, a disc jockey, and other performances. The 16th annual Holi festival organized by DJ Prashant is slated to be held at PCS in April 2026.

The UP's Campus Program Board organized a Holi Hai Festival in 2016. PCC hosted a Holi celebration in 2023. Reed College's Holi celebration in 2023 was organized by the South Asian Student Union. According to the Wilsonville Alliance for Inclusive Community, there have also been Holi celebrations at PSU. PSU's Middle East, North Africa, South Asia Student Center celebrates the holiday.

DJ Anjali and the Incredible Kid performed at the Holi Spring Harvest Festival at Topaz Farm in 2022 and 2023. The fourth annual event in 2025 included Bhangra and Bollywood dancing and music, farm animals, performances by DJ Anjali and the Incredible Kid, and South Asian cuisine.

==== Purim ====
The Jewish holiday of Purim has been celebrated in various ways. In 2021, during the COVID-19 pandemic, Congregation Neveh Shalom hosted a drive-through carnival, allowing children to celebrate the holiday by wearing costumes and receiving gifts. In 2023, approximately 300 people attended an event at the Pickle Factory in North Portland featuring drag kings and drag queens.

==== Ramadan ====
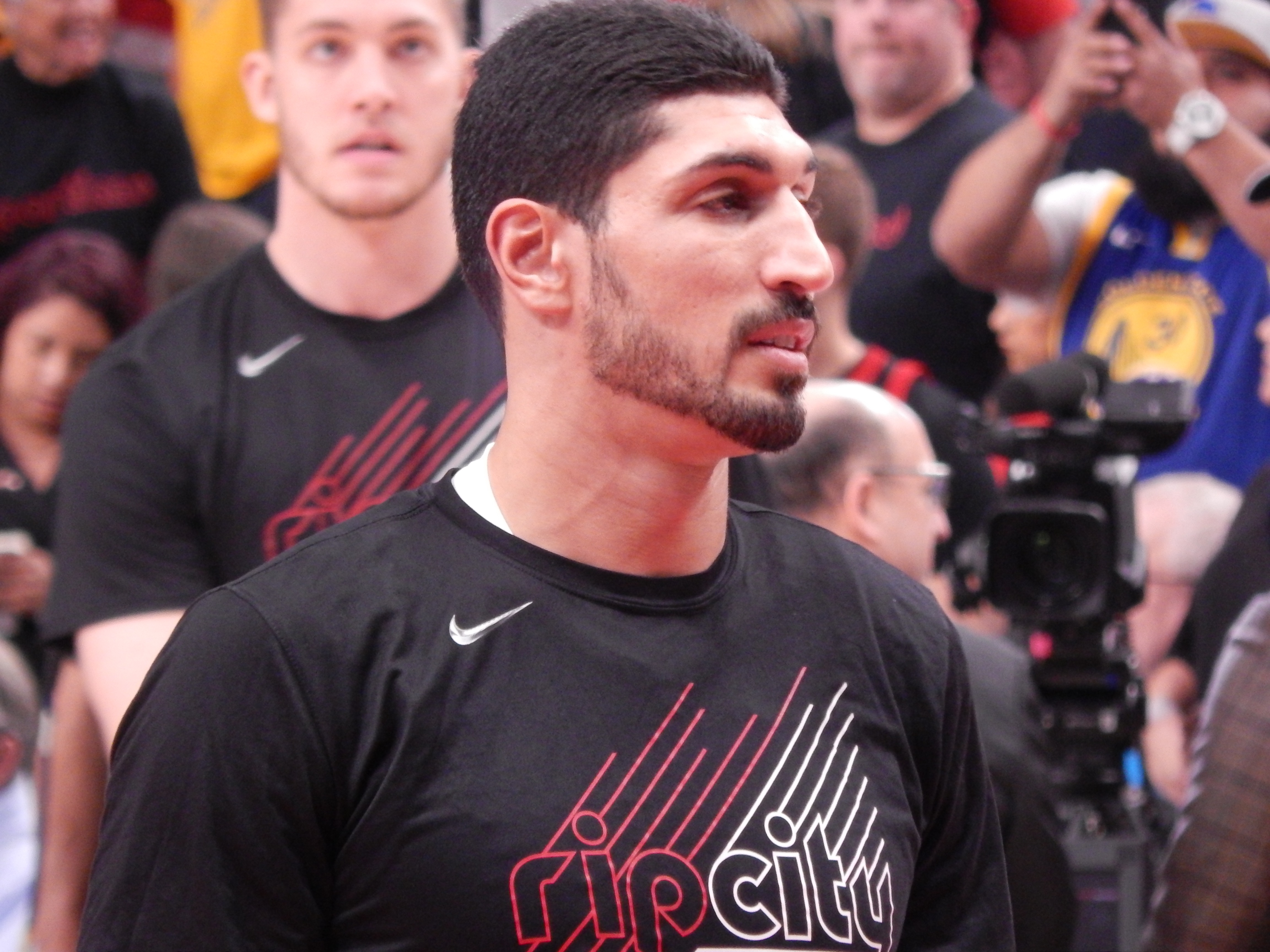
News outlets have reported on how Portland Trail Blazers player Enes Kanter Freedom (pictured in 2019) observes Ramadan.

The city has seen various activities to observe the Islamic holy month of Ramadan. Mayor Charlie Hales and his wife Nancy attended a Ramadan celebration in 2015. The Ramadan Tent Project was brought to the city for the first time in 2016. In 2017, Oregon Public Broadcasting said Ramadan celebrations at the Muslim Education Center in Southwest Portland "took on new tones" after the Portland train attack, which occurred just before Ramadan and prompted the PPB to add patrols during the holiday. In 2020 and 2021, during the pandemic, the local community had to adapt to social distancing requirements. The UP has provided resources to students during Ramadan.

The Islamic Center of Portland has an annual open house ahead of Ramadan. The Port of Portland has considered establishing a prayer room for Ramadan at Portland International Airport. The Oregonian and The New York Times have reported on how Portland Trail Blazers player Enes Kanter Freedom observes Ramadan.

DarSalam, Mira's East African Cuisine, and Queen Mama's Kitchen are among local restaurants that have served customary food and drinks for the holiday. In 2025, a writer for Bon Appétit described writing about Ramadan food traditions in the U.S., while living in Portland in 2017, and recalled: "As I visited mosques and community centers across the city, I kept hearing the same thing from Muslim teens: During Ramadan, especially after leaving the mosque late at night, they love to visit Portland's famed doughnut chain Voodoo Doughnuts. Why? They love the cheekiness and the idea of eating something seemingly haram—it is not—at a place that serves doughnuts with a Satan sign on it, and another called the 'Cock-N-Balls.'" Rose City Book Pub served iftar dinners every night during Ramadan in 2025. In 2025, the Muslim Advisory Council hosted twenty PPB officers to join local Muslim in breaking a fast through iftar at the Multnomah Arts Center.

=== Secular federal holidays ===
==== Independence Day ====
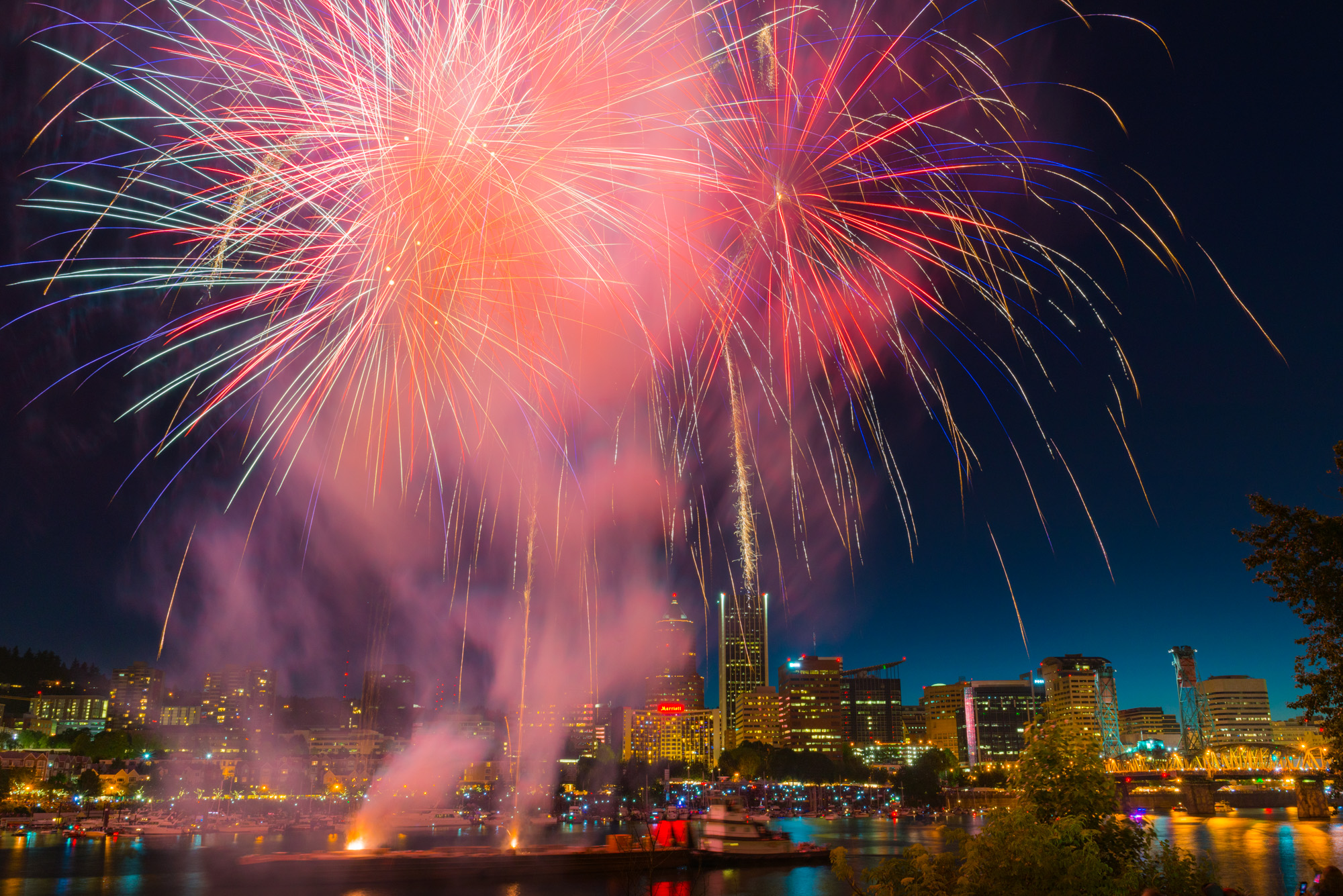
Fireworks at the Waterfront Blues Festival, as part of Independence Day celebrations in 2013

The federal holiday Independence Day (or the Fourth of July) is celebrated annually. Large fireworks shows are held at Tom McCall Waterfront Park and Oaks Amusement Park and can be viewed from various sites around the city. Other activities have included parades, picnics, and laser lighting displays.

==== Juneteenth ====
The federal holiday Juneteenth is celebrated annually. Clara Peoples, is credited with spearheading the city's annual celebration in 1972. Mayor Ted Wheeler formally recognized Juneteenth as a paid holiday in 2020.

==== Memorial Day ====
The federal holiday Memorial Day is celebrated annually. Several sites host memorial services, including the Oregon Vietnam Veterans Memorial and Willamette National Cemetery. Memorial Day is the only time the Wilhelm's Portland Memorial Funeral Home and grounds are open to the public.

==== Thanksgiving ====
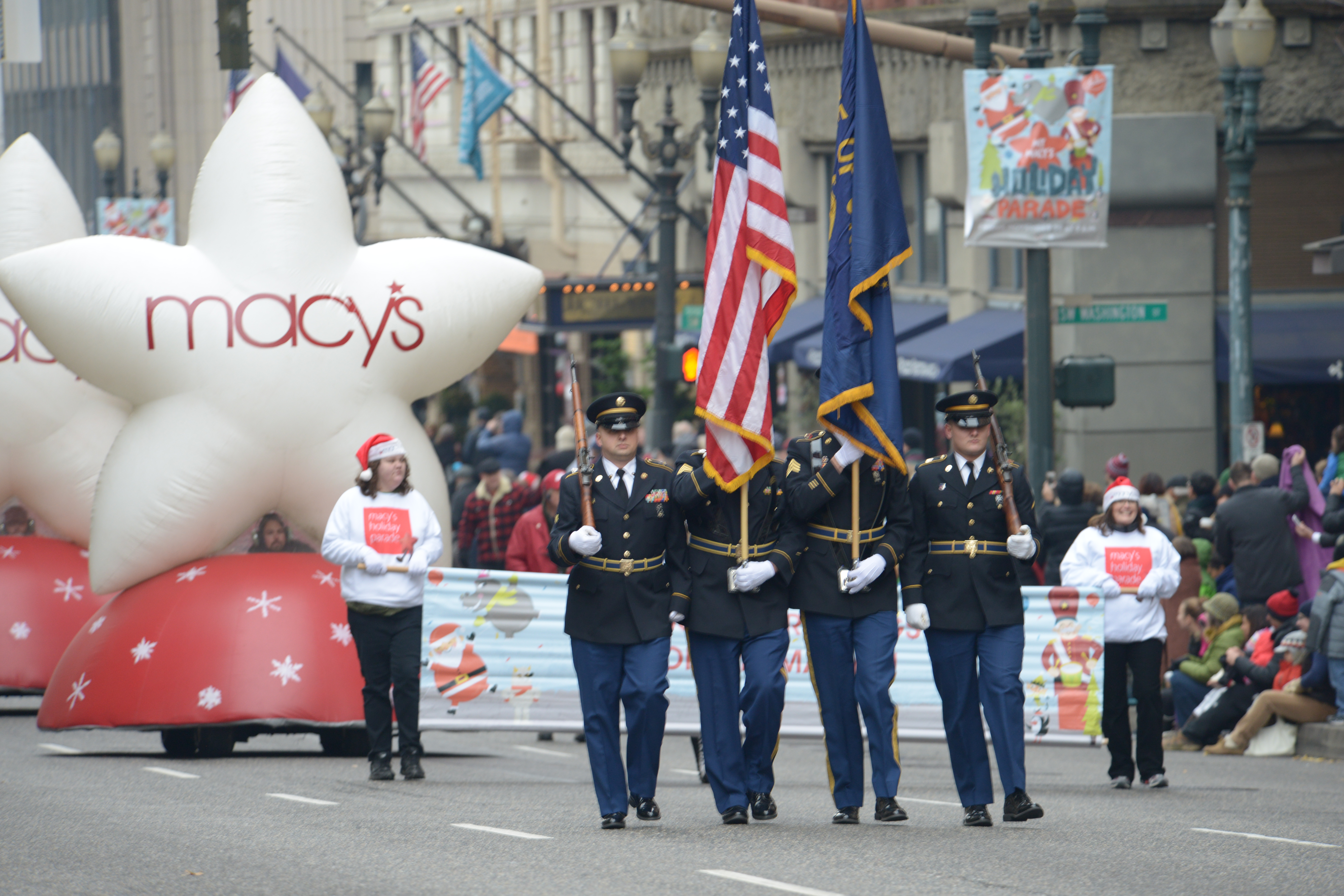
Macy's Thanksgiving Day Parade, 2013

The federal holiday Thanksgiving is celebrated annually. A parade was held from 1987 to 2016, initially created by Meier & Frank and later sponsored by Macy's. The city has multiple annual turkey trots, including one at the Portland International Raceway, another at the Oregon Zoo and International Rose Test Garden, and one sponsored by Tofurkey that has entrants travel from Oaks Amusement Park to the Sellwood Bridge and back. The city has also hosted football games on Thanksgiving. Other activities help launch the Christmas shopping season, such as turkey bowling at Lloyd Center for Black Friday, Small Business Saturday, and other initiatives to support small businesses. Portland Rescue Mission, Sunshine Division, and Union Gospel Mission provide Thanksgiving meals to people annually.

==== Veterans Day ====
Portland had a Veterans Day parade for approximately 40 years. Established in 1974, the parade takes place in the Hollywood neighborhood. The event was canceled in 2020 because of the COVID-19 pandemic. The 2021 parade was canceled because there was no sponsor. The event was also canceled in 2025 because of limited funding. The 2026 event was held along Martin Luther King Jr. Boulevard in Northeast Portland's King neighborhood.

The parade has included floats, marching bands, and historic vehicles.

=== Other holidays and observances ===
Portland has seen celebrations for India's Independence Day, including the annual India Festival.

The city has also hosted activities commemorating Qixi Festival, also known as Chinese Valentine's Day.

==== 420 ====
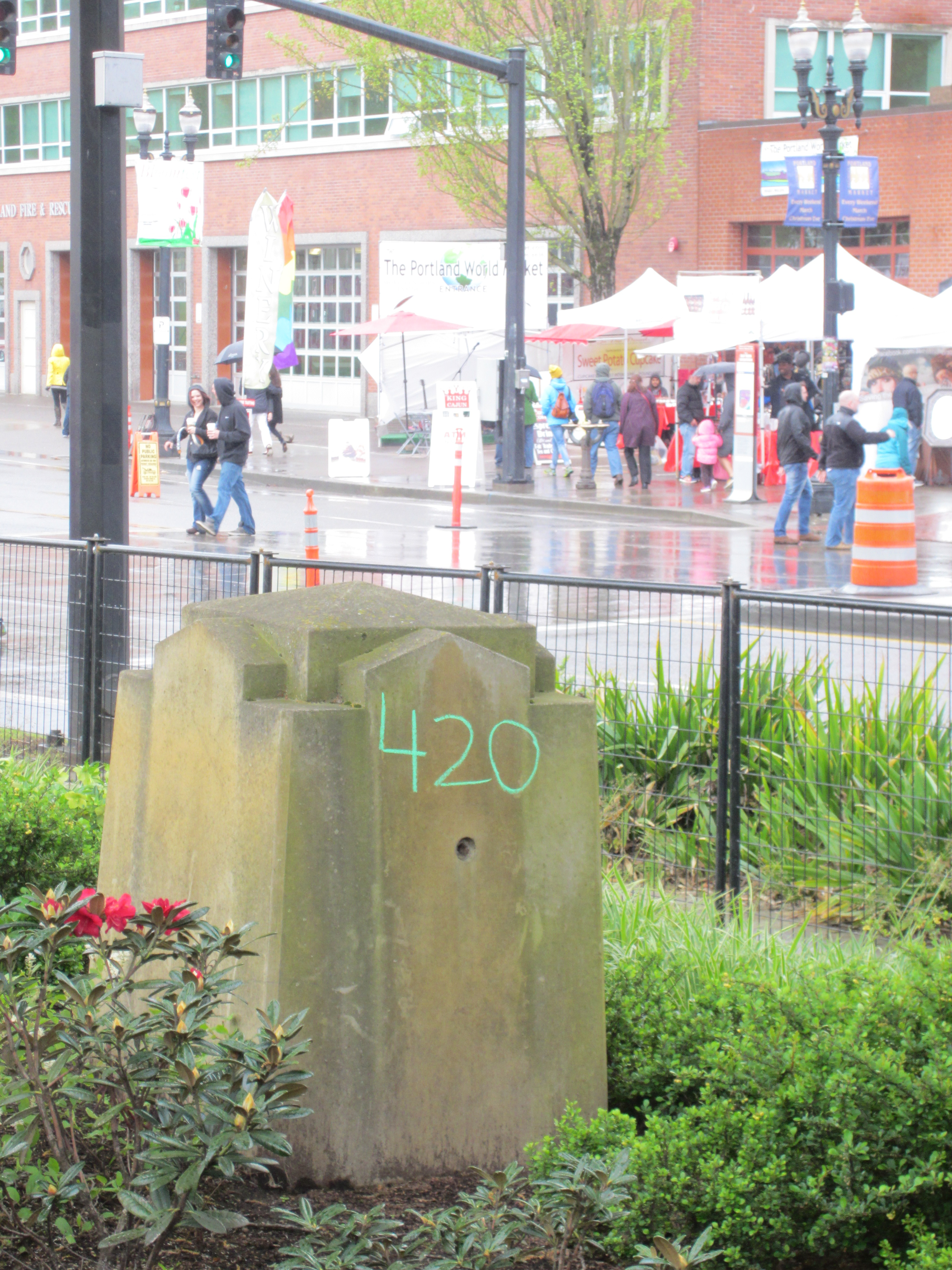
The text "420" written on the side of a cement block at Portland Saturday Market in Portland, Oregon in April 2014

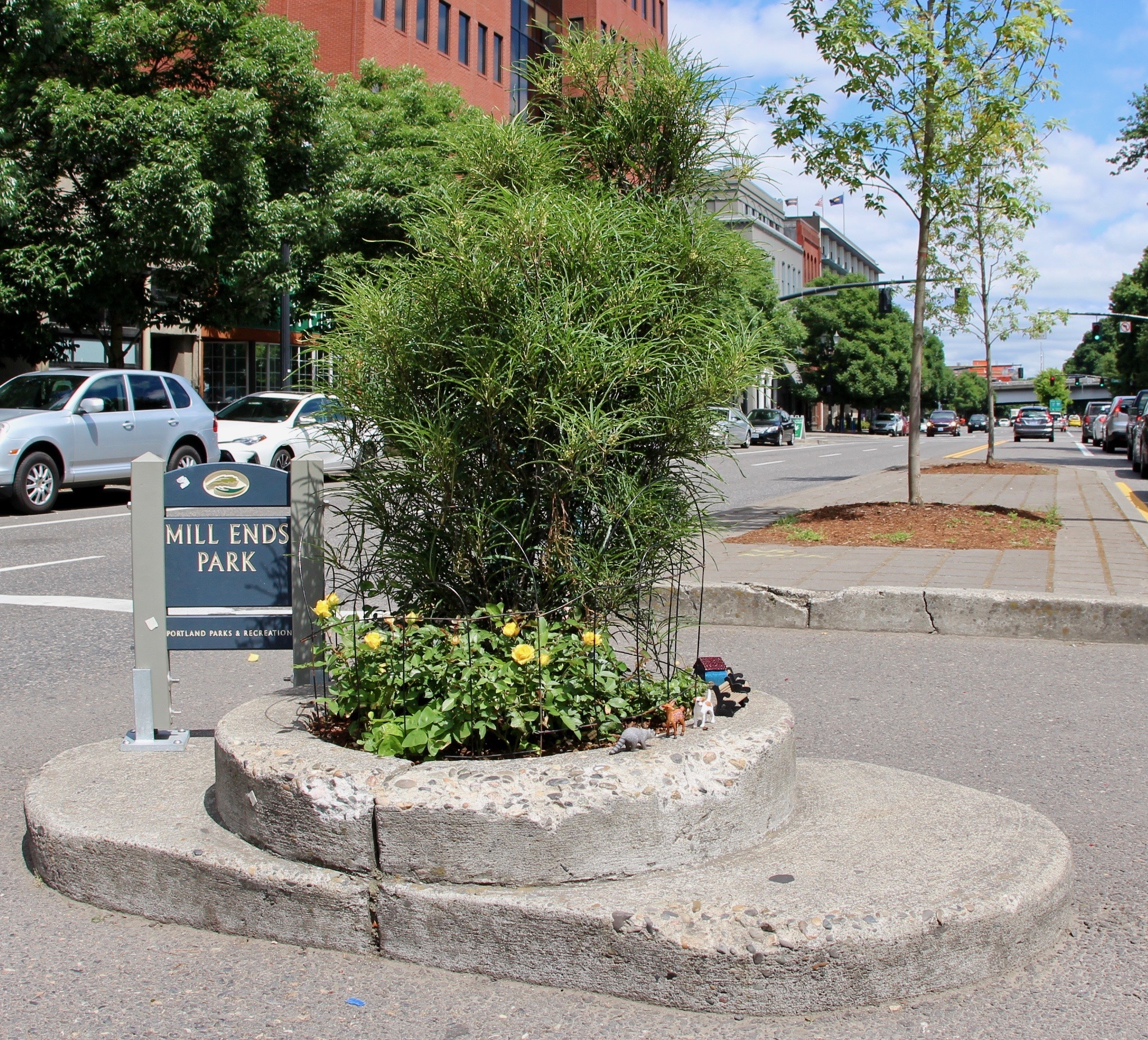
For the holiday in 2018, someone planted a cannabis plant in Mill Ends Park (pictured in June 2018, without the cannabis plant).

The unofficial cannabis holiday "420" (observed annually on April 20 in cannabis culture) is celebrated each year. In 2024, Brianna Wheeler of Willamette Week wrote, "in Portland, aka pothead paradise, there is no shortage of ways to celebrate what has since become the highest of holidaze. From stoney river walks to bluff-top vista stone zones to afternoon socials and evening dance parties, there's 4/20 fun to be had for every kind of cannathusiast." Mount Tabor is a popular spot for celebrating the holiday. In 2014, a couple hundred people celebrated at Mount Tabor. There were dogs, picnics, drums, musicians, and cheers at 4:20 p.m.

In 2017, Dante's hosted "420/24/7: A Weed Cabaret" featuring burlesque and drag performers paying tribute to cannabis. Additionally, "Celebrate 4/20" was held at the High End Market Place. The event included food, music, and deals on cannabis products. The venue 45 East hosted "Bass Cube 420" featuring music by Clokwork, Deekline, DJ Wiggles, Dubloadz, HAL-V & SpaceCase, Keith MacKenzie, and Krust Funds. In 2018, Weed Aficionado magazine hosted a "4/20 Party" at the Jupiter Hotel. Tickets included gift bags, music, and access to a "weed bus". Additionally, No Vacancy Lounge hosted a "420 Celebration" featuring ExMag and the North Portland cannabis dispensary Portland Best Buds hosted a "4/20 Pro Wrestling Rock Show Party" with professional wrestlers, music, drag queens, and food. The Hamsterdam Cafe in Southwest Portland hosted a "420 Smoke Party" featuring live music and an ice bong-carving demonstration. Someone placed a cannabis plant in Mill Ends Park on April 20, 2018.

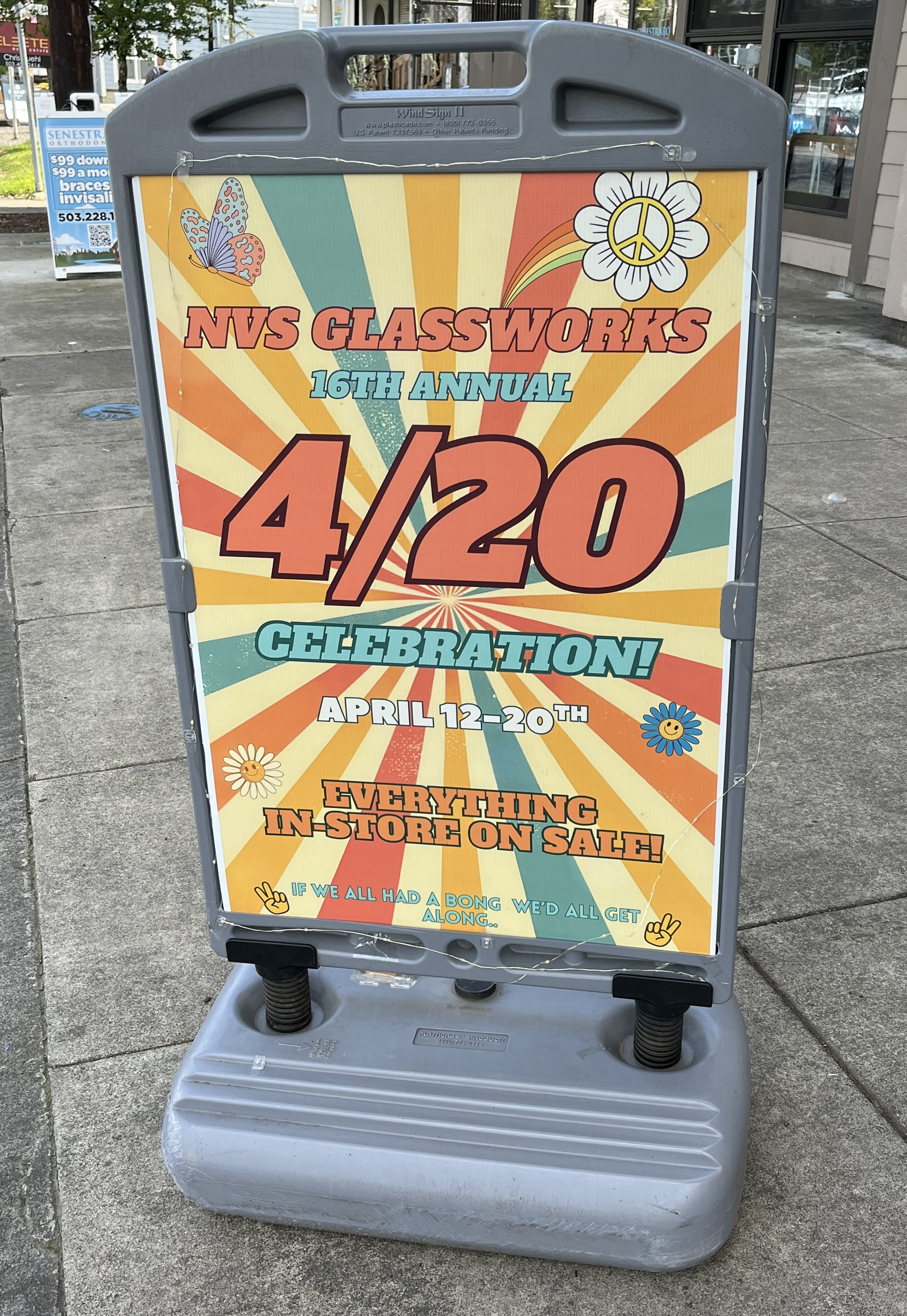
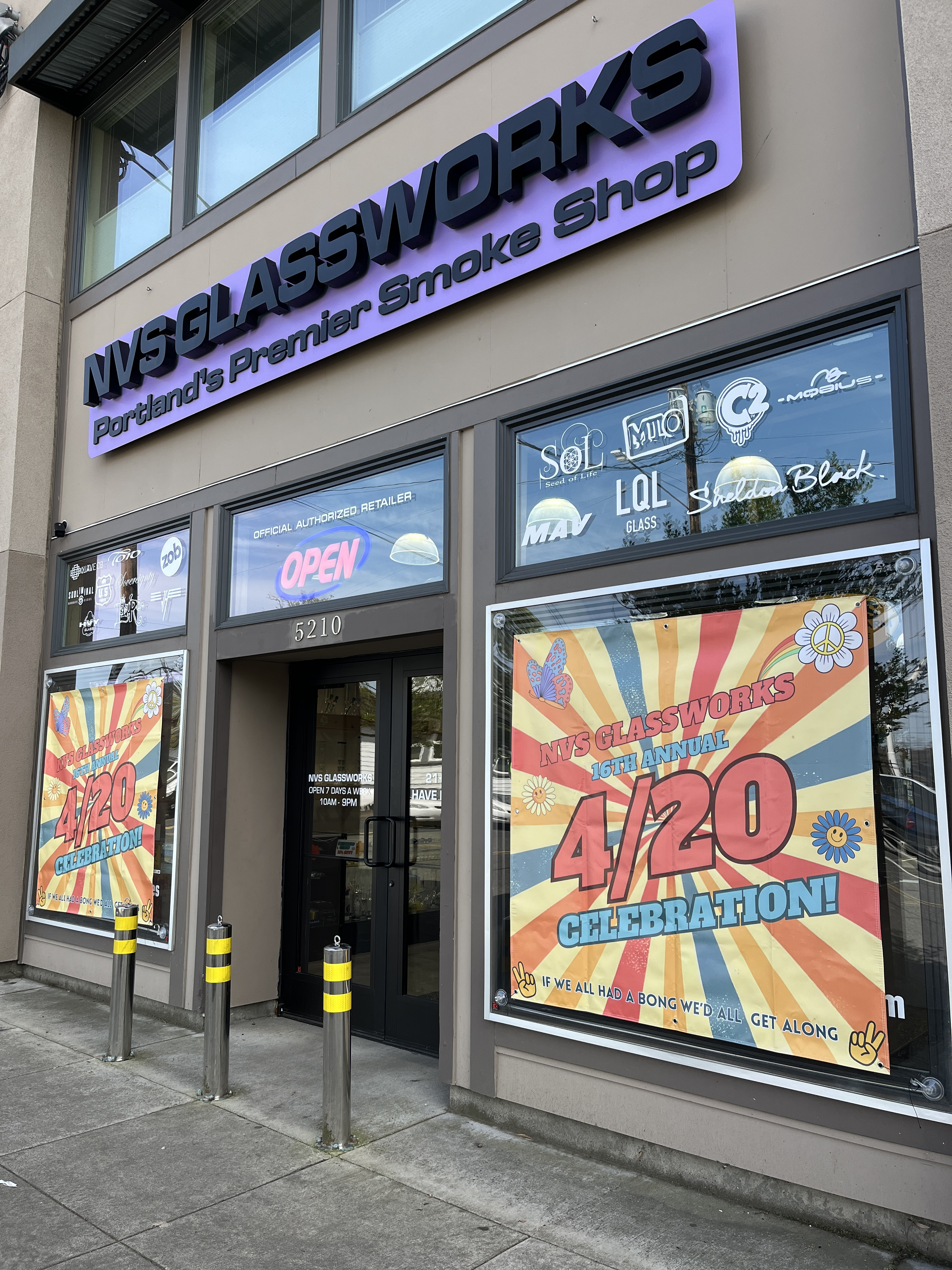
Sign referencing the holiday (left) at an NVS Glassworks location (exterior pictured with additional signage) in southeast Portland's Woodstock neighborhood, 2026

In 2021, the chamber music group 45th Parallel hosted a program with Steve Reich's Music for 18 Musicians. While consumption was not allowed during the concert, guests were given vouchers with coupons to local cannabis dispensaries. Charles Rose of Oregon ArtsWatch wrote, "This is the closest we've gotten so far to a full-on hotbox at a classical show in Portland. Some of us have been waiting for a show like this for a long time." In 2024, Living Häus Beer Co. hosted a "4/20 Tie-Dye Party" and the Rhythms Community Studio celebrated 420 and Earth Month by hosting a pottery painting party. The dance venue Opaline hosted "The Smoke Show", described by Portland television station KOIN as a "mini-music festival" with disc jockeys and producers from the Pacific Northwest. The Portland Pickles Public House hosted "Riffer Madness Comedy Roast", a roast inspired by the film Reefer Madness. The "4/20 Tie-Dye Party" was held again in 2026, along with the event "4/20 Häus Bottle Share".

In 2026, Nova PDX hosted "The Gateway Show", which has been described as "a high-concept comedy show format ... blending traditional stand-up with an unconventional second act performed under altered conditions". The event has comedians perform a set, followed by a second after cannabis consumption.

In 2019, Stumptown Coffee Roasters launched a limited-edition cold brew coffee with cannabidiol (CBD), starting on April 20. Voodoo Doughnut offered 420-themed specials for the holiday in 2019. In 2025, the business offered special food items (chicken and waffles doughnuts and maple blazer "blunt" triangular doughnuts) for the holiday weekend. The "blunt box" returned in 2026. In 2025, Bar Carlo hosted a "blaze and praise" drag brunch, which did not allow on-site consumption.

===== Cannabis dispensaries =====
Some local cannabis dispensaries and lounges offer promotions or host events for the holiday. Northwest Cannabis Company hosts Northwest Cannafest each April. The event claims to be Oregon's largest "420" celebration and has featured glassblowing and free doughnuts from Voodoo with purchases. In 2022, a bus left at 4:20pm to take guests to the venue At the Garages for performances by the Beastie Boys tribute band Grand Royal, the Prince tribute band Erotic City, and the Tom Petty tribute band Petty Fever. The concert was hosted by Ben Zabin of the cannabis-themed magic show Smokus Pocus. The 2023 event in the Portland suburb Lake Oswego had Fleetwood Mac and U2 tribute bands and a party at 4:20 p.m. The third annual event was held in Lake Oswego in 2024. The three-day event in 2025 had disc jockeys, a food truck serving tacos, and free cookies. Amelia Williams included Northwest Cannafest in Leafly's 2023 list of the nation's top 21 cannabis events for the holiday, describing it as a "proper weed party". In a similar list in 2024, she wrote, "Where can you see a Weezer tribute band, eat donuts, and watch magicians on stilts, all while enjoying quality cannabis?"

Potland Cannabis Dispensary has an annual parking lot party for the holiday, featuring art, food, and tattoos. Beer Bar, located in the Buckman neighborhood of Southeast Portland, had a holiday event in 2026 with disc jockeys, food, and tattoos. Bridge City Collective had various activities at its locations throughout the city over four days in 2026. According to the Portland Tribune, "The multi-day format [was] designed to distribute traffic across several days rather than concentrating activity on April 20 alone, reflecting a growing trend among cannabis retailers to expand 4/20 into a full weekend of programming and in-store engagement."

===== Film =====
In 2021, the SPLIFF Film Festival featured short cannabis-themed films. In 2022, the Portland Mercury said the "by-stoners, for-stoners festival compiles a kaleidoscopic collection of weird, contemplative, and laugh-out-loud films". In 2023, Astral Projections presented "420 Toke-tacular: The Ultimate Rip in 16mm" at the Hollywood Theatre. The Hollywood Theatre hosted "420 Toke-tacular 2: Electric Bongaloo in 16mm", which featured screenings of multiple films and shows, in 2024. "420 Toketacular in 16mm" was held in 2026. The Portland Tribune described the event as "a curated screening featuring analog film prints from multiple eras of drug education, counterculture media and experimental animation". It included the short film The High. In 2025, Tomorrow Theater screened the stoner film Dazed and Confused (1993) and hosted a handicraft session.

==== 503 Day ====
The Portland Mercury has described 503 Day as "a local holiday to celebrate all things Portland". The holiday is celebrated on May 3 and its name references the area code used for northwest Oregon.

The first 503 Day celebration was held in 2025 and the mayor issued a proclamation declaring it "a totally real holiday". The 2025 event was held at Ankeny Alley and featured karaoke and Toody Cole and Maxine Dexter.

The 2026 event was organized by the Ankeny Alley Business Association and featured a beer garden, karaoke, a silent disco, and performances by Thomas Lauderdale of Pink Martini. Mayor Keith Wilson spoke at the event. The fan event "5.03 Day" was held at the Moda Center to celebrate the Portland Fire.

==== Arbor Day ====
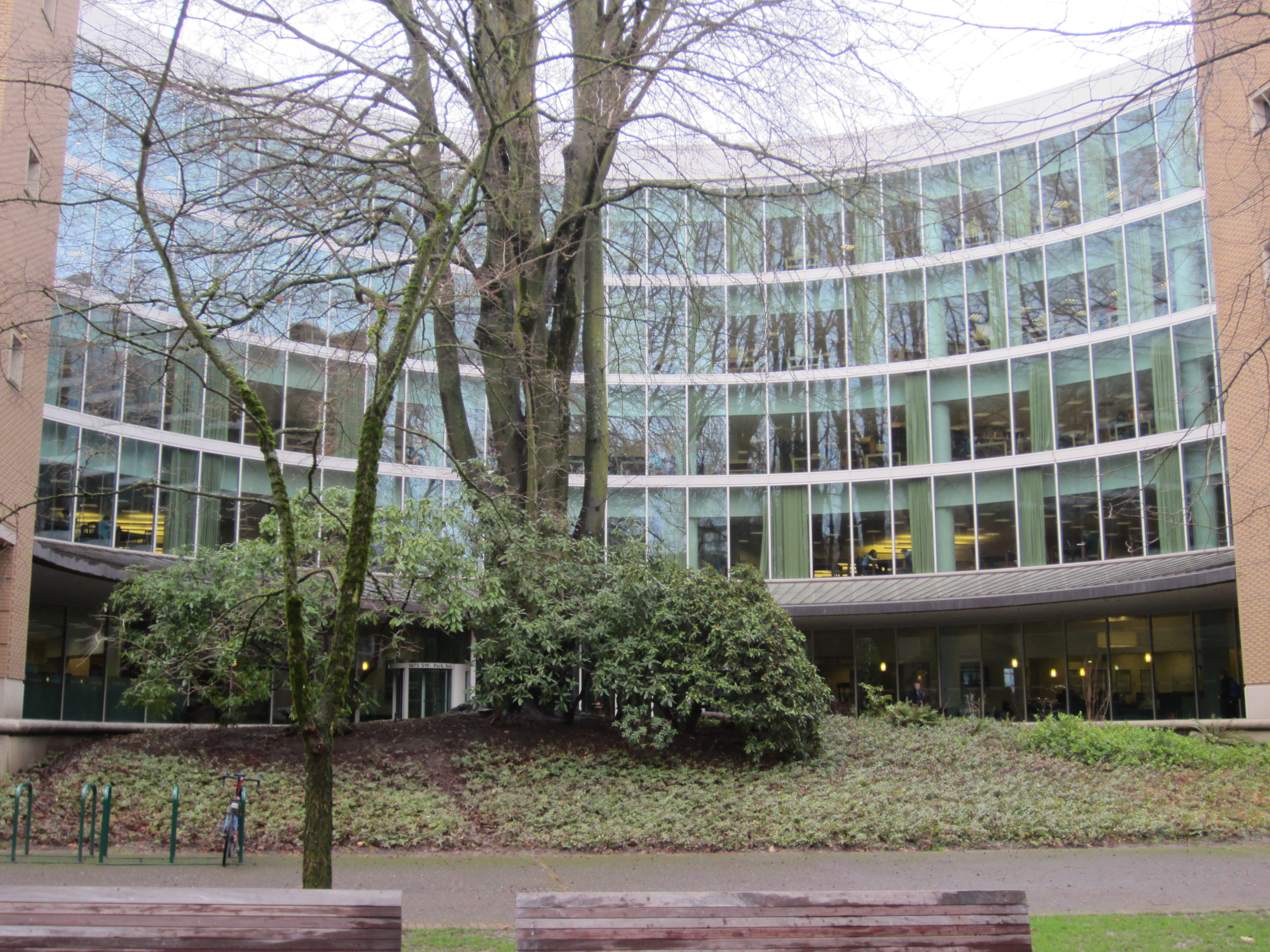
On Arbor Day in 2022, a tree encircled by Portland State University's Branford Price Millar Library (pictured in 2014) was designated an Oregon Heritage Tree.

Arbor Day has been celebrated annually in Portland for approximately 135 years. Historically celebrated in April, the city has commemorated Arbor Day in October since 2019 because the "increasingly hot dry summers make it more difficult for trees planted in April to succeed", according to KOIN. In addition to hosting tree planting events, the city distributes free yard trees to residents. Some activities have been billed as Arbor Week or Arbor Month celebrations.

According to the City of Portland's website, Arbor Day has been celebrated locally since 1889. In 2019, Street Roots said, "This is the first year Portland is celebrating Arbor Day in October. It was moved from April because, due to climate change, trees planted in spring are no longer faring as well as trees planted between October and March, when there is more rain." In 2025, the Portland Observer said, "Each year, Portland Arbor Day moves to a different neighborhood to highlight the city's diverse tree canopy and recognize local efforts to grow and care for it."

In 2007, students planted trees at an Arbor Day celebration at Lent Elementary in the Southeast Portland part of the Lents neighborhood. The 2010, an Arbor Day celebration was held at West Powellhurst Elementary School in Southeast Portland's Powellhurst-Gilbert neighborhood. Several events and activities were held for Arbor Month in 2014. The Arbor Day Festival was held at the farmers' market in the South Park Blocks. In addition to tree-themed activities, Portland Parks & Recreation presented the Bill Naito Community Trees Award. The 2017 and 2018 events were held at Mt. Scott Park in Southeast Portland's Mt. Scott-Arleta neighborhood. The 2017 event had award ceremonies, botanical printmaking, bucket truck rides, live music, an ecological scavenger hunt, tree climbing demonstrations, and tree giveaways. The 2019 event was held at East Holladay Park in the Northeast Portland part of the Hazelwood neighborhood.

In 2020, during the pandemic, Arbor Day celebrations were held virtually. The 2021 event was held at Lents Park in the Lents neighborhood. On Arbor Day in April 2022, a tree outside PSU's Branford Price Millar Library was designated an Oregon Heritage Tree. In April 2023, students at Tucker Maxon School in Southeast Portland planted trees to celebrate the holiday. In October, Arbor Day celebrations were held at McCoy Park. The city's 2024 event was held at Glenfair Park in the Northeast Portland part of the Glenfair neighborhood. Twelve trees were planted in the park and 100 more from the Yard Tree Giveaway team were distributed to attendees. The event also featured tree-themed arts and crafts, bucket truck rides, and face painting. The 2025 event was held at Sacajawea Head Start in Northeast Portland's Cully neighborhood.

==== Cinco de Mayo ====
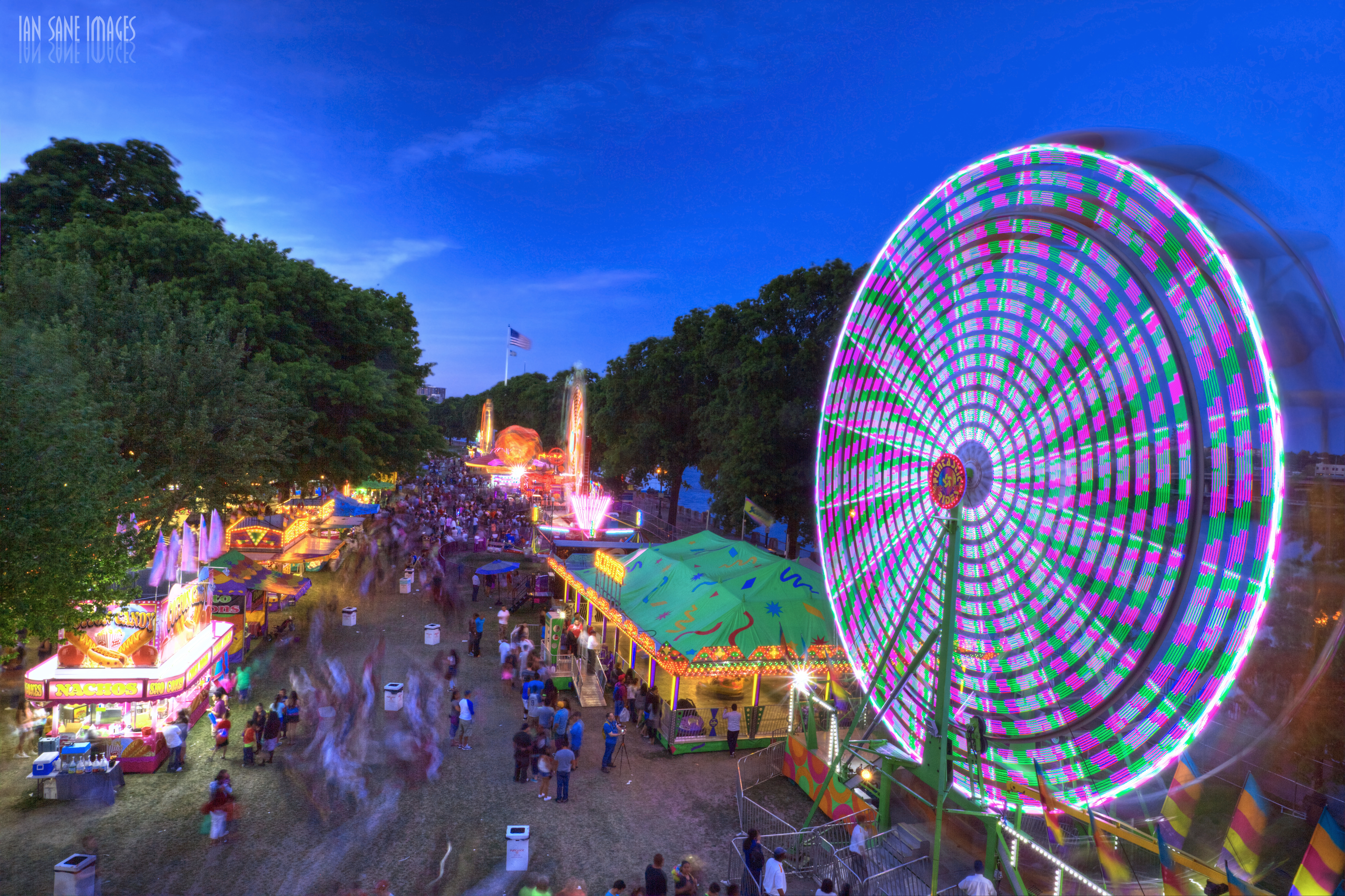
Portland Cinco de Mayo Fiesta

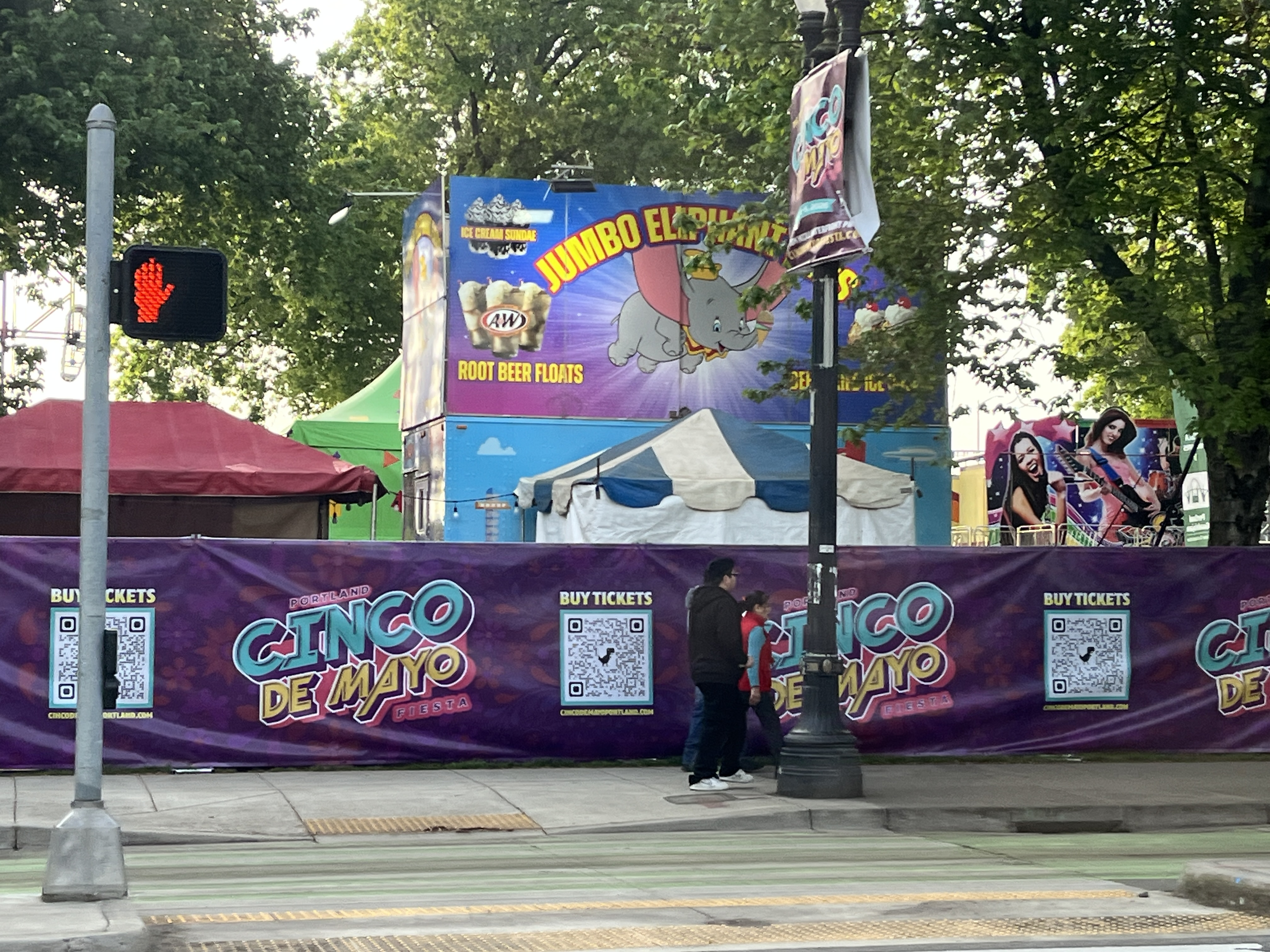
Portland Cinco de Mayo Fiesta, 2026

Cinco de Mayo is celebrated annually. The annual festival Portland Cinco de Mayo Fiesta was established almost four decades ago. Described as the city's largest celebration of Mexican culture and Oregon's largest "multicultural celebration", the event is hosted by the Portland Guadalajara Sister City Association and features a carnival with amusement rides, mariachi, and food vendors. Historically, the event has attracted between 30,000 to 60,000 people; 53,000 people attended the festival in 2023, following a three-year hiatus because of the pandemic. Performers for the 2024 event included Mariachi Ciudad de Guadalajara, Oregon-based Ballet Folklorico, and multiple bands. In 2025, the festival's public naturalization ceremony was canceled because of budget cuts. The event featured lucha libre wrestlers. Five days of activities are slated for the 2026 event at Tom McCall Waterfront Park.

In 2012, Northwest Children's Theater presented a bilingual world premiere adaptation of El Zorrito: The Legend of the Boy Zorro around the holiday. The musical play had multiple references to Cinco de Mayo. The Cinco de Mayo Run/Walk in 2017 featured live music and a post-event party. In 2019, the now-defunct bar and restaurant Dig a Pony hosted a holiday celebration with Spanish music, empanadas, and margaritas, and Harvey's held a Cinco de Mayo comedy show. In 2025, The Oregonian described Joshua Josué's music tribute "Chicano de Mayo" at the Mission Theater and Pub "a way to differentiate from traditional Cinco de Mayo celebrations in the U.S."

Many of the city's restaurants, especially those serving Mexican cuisine, have offered specials for the holiday, including El Gallo Taqueria, Güero, Nuestra Cocina, Tamale Boy, and Xico. River Pig Saloon had hosted pig racing for Cinco de Mayo annually. In 2015, Doug Adams and Vitaly Paley collaborated with a Top Chef contestant for a Cinco de Mayo dinner at Imperial. In 2025, a local Tipsy Scoop location served tequila-infused flights and "Piñata Colada" sundaes for the holiday.

==== Day of the Dead ====
Ofrenda at Mt. Tabor Creations in Southeast Portland, Oregon, 2026

The holiday Day of the Dead (Spanish: Día de (los) Muertos) is celebrated annually. Portland has seen various events and activities organized to commemorate the holiday, including catrina contests, comedy shows, community altars, festivals, library and printmaking workshops, and theatrical performances.

==== Halloween ====
The holiday Halloween is celebrated in many ways in Portland. Annual events during the Halloween season have included the witch paddle, a local iteration of Thrill the World, and previously the Doll Asylum. The city hosts many haunted attractions and other Halloween-themed activities and displays each year, including Fear PDX and ScareGrounds PDX. Portland also hosts Summerween activities.

==== Indigenous Peoples' Day ====
The holiday Indigenous Peoples' Day is celebrated annually. Portland City Council unanimously passed a declaration designating the holiday in 2015. The Indigenous Peoples Day of Rage occurred in Portland in 2020.

==== International Worker's Day ====
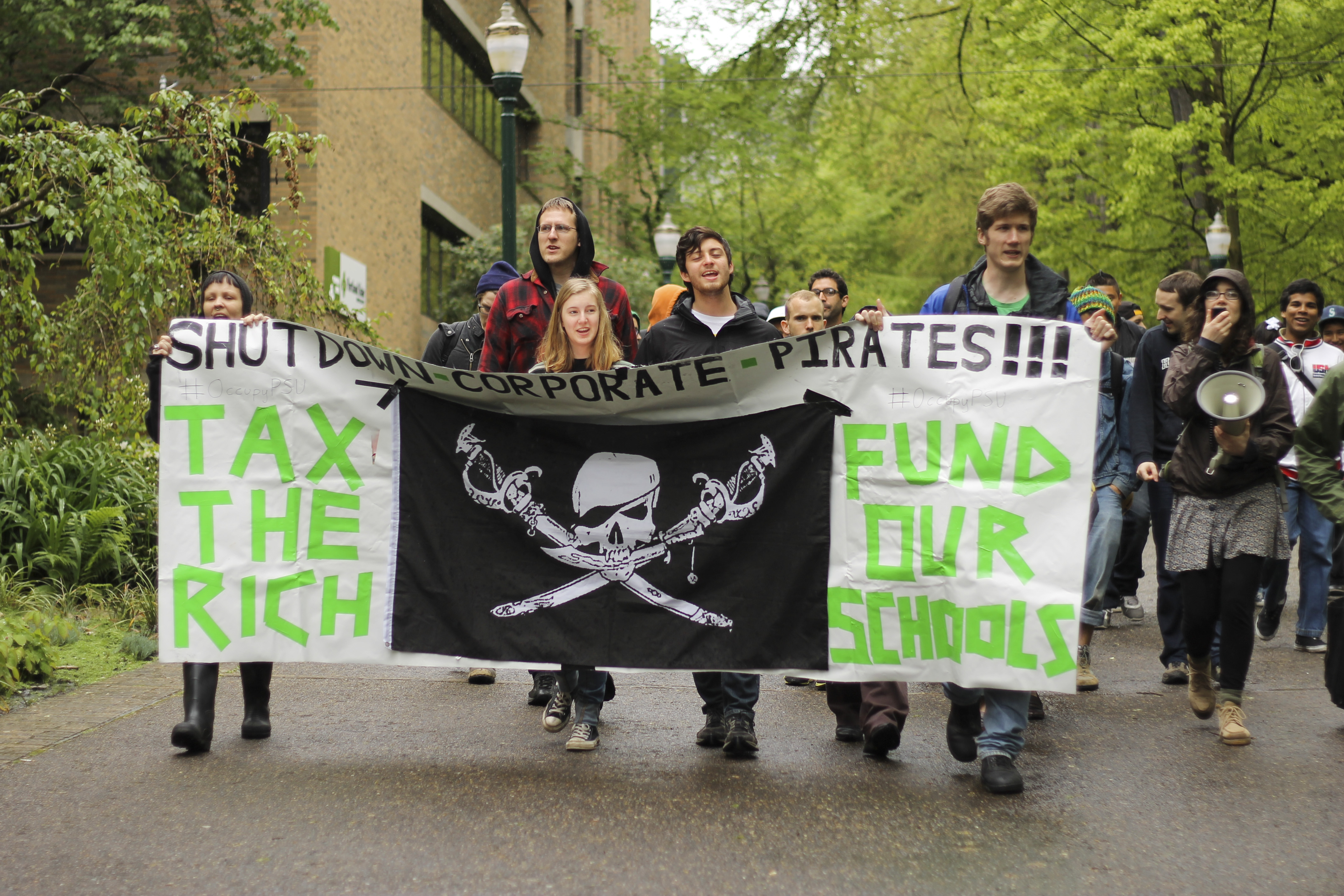
May Day demonstration at Portland State University, 2012

The holiday International Workers' Day (also known as May Day, but not to be confused with the holiday of the same name commemorating the start of summer) is celebrated annually. Portland has seen many demonstrations on the holiday, which are often referred to as "May Day protests". Some of the demonstrations have led to arrests, fires, and vandalism.

==== Kwanzaa ====
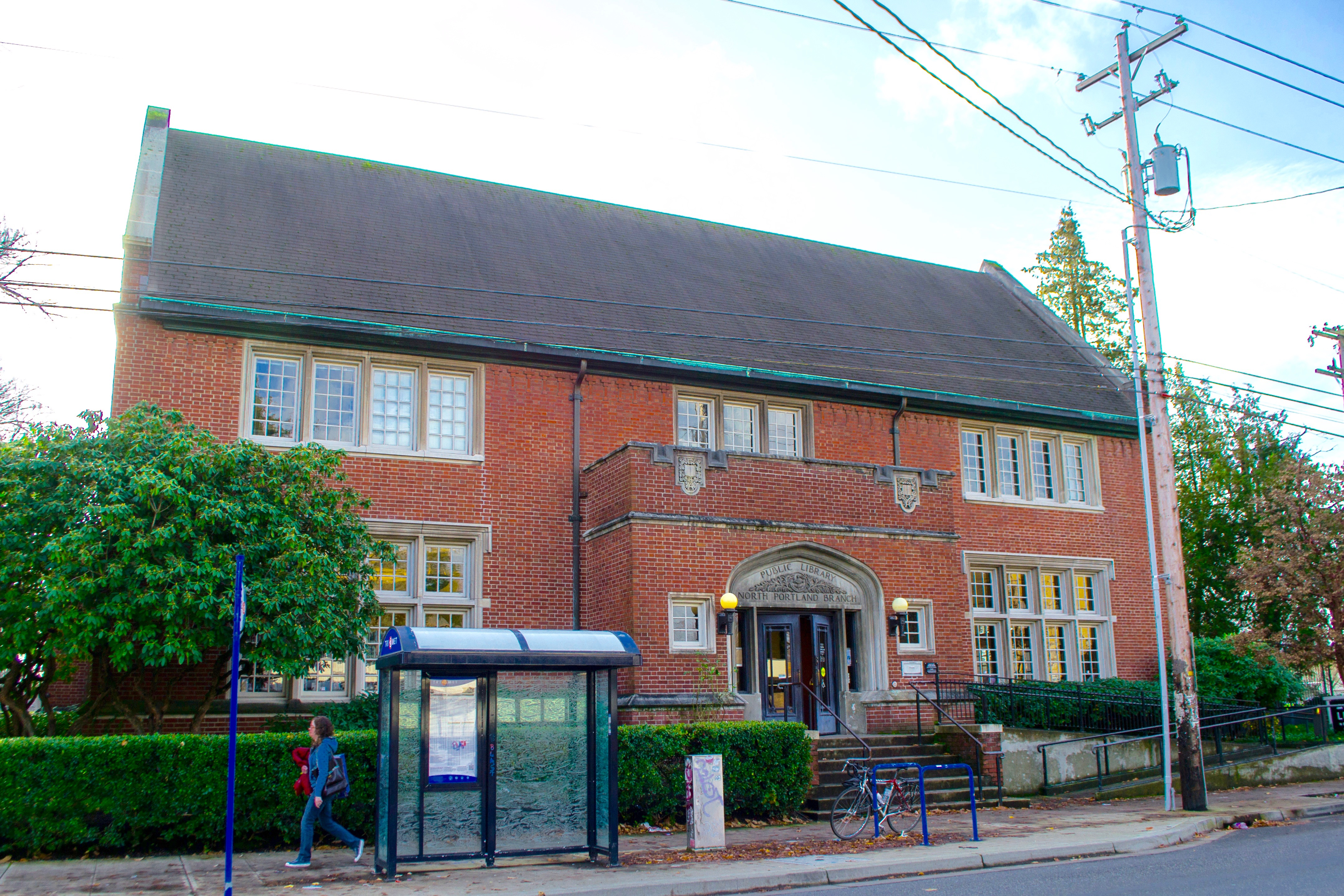
The North Portland Library (exterior pictured in 2012) has hosted Kwanzaa celebrations.

The holiday Kwanzaa is celebrated annually. The city of Portland has observed the holiday since 1971. The Community Kwanzaa Celebration is held annually. The event starting in late December 2024 was organized by Vanport Remodeling & Construction and the nonprofit organization Good in the Hood. It featured a candle lighting ceremony, a clown, drumming, and spoken word.

In 2008, there were Kwanzaa celebrations at the Matt Dishman Community Center in Northeast Portland and the Interstate Firehouse Cultural Center in North Portland. A Kwanzaa celebration at Matt Dishman Community Center in 2011 had drumming and a candlelighting. A Kwanzaa celebration at the same venue in late 2016 featured the Okropong African Dance and Drum Group from Ghana. "Kwanzaa Unity in the Community" was held at Matt Dishman Community Center in 2017 and had storytelling and Black-owned vendors. There was a Kwanzaa celebration at Self Enhancement Inc. in North Portland in 2019.

In 2012, the Kwanzaa on Killingsworth pop-up market was organized by Darrell Grant, a professor at PSU. The City of Portland hosted a Kwanzaa celebration in late 2022. In 2023, the family-friendly "Rhythms of Kwanzaa" event was hosted by a local children's entertainer. In 2025, another Kwanzaa event at the Matt Dishman Community Center included dancing, food, music, and spoken word poetry.

Multnomah County Library has hosted Kwanzaa activities. The North Portland Library had a Kwanzaa table-setting exhibit in 1998. The library hosted Kwanzaa celebrations in 2012 and 2018. In 2023, the library's Black Cultural Library Advocates (BCLA) hosted a Kwanzaa "pre-celebration" at the Soul Restoration Center in Northeast Portland.

The Portland Gay Men's Chorus has included songs celebrating Kwanzaa and other holidays in programming.

Elsewhere in the metropolitan area, the Beaverton Black People's Union hosts the "Joyous Kwanzaa Celebration" in Beaverton annually. The third event started in late December 2025 and featured African drumming, dancing, stepping, and approximately 30 vendors.

==== Lunar New Year ====
Lunar New Year is celebrated annually. Cultural institutions like the Lan Su Chinese Garden and the Portland Chinatown Museum host activities such as dragon and lion dances as well as lantern viewings. Portland has hosted events specific to Chinese New Year and the Vietnamese holiday Tết, and the city is home to multiple lion dance teams that perform throughout the region.

==== Mardi Gras ====
The annual Mardi Gras Parade and Ball is organized by the Mysti Krewe of Nimbus.

==== Mid-Autumn Festival ====
Portland has seen celebrations commemorating Mid-Autumn Festival. The White Lotus Foundation hosts the annual Portland Mid-Autumn Festival, featuring cultural performances, games, and workshops. The event expanded to two days in 2025. The event at Shun Fat Supermarket in southeast Portland in 2026 featured cultural events, a lantern parade, games and other activities for children, and approximately 100 vendors. In 2026, David Ashton of East PDX News said the event has a "stage-driven program".

Lan Su Chinese Garden hosts Mid-Autumn celebrations. The three-day event in 2021 featured lantern viewings and the garden's first lion dances since the start of the COVID-19 pandemic. The museum hosted a Mid-Autumn Moonlight Market in 2022 and 2023. An estimated 2,000 people participated in 2022. Activities were "reimagined" in 2025. In 2026, the daytime Mid-Autumn Across Asia event, presented in collaboration with the Chinese Friendship Association of Portland, had crafts, mooncakes, performances, and vendors. Mid-Autumn Night Out had a lantern parade, moon rabbit lantern sculptures from China, and an illuminated dragon ribbon performance.

The Shenzhen Business Chamber of Commerce hosts a Mid-Autumn celebration at Newmark Theatre. The theme for the 2026 event was "East Meets West—Tradition, Modernity, Creativity".

==== Mother's Day ====
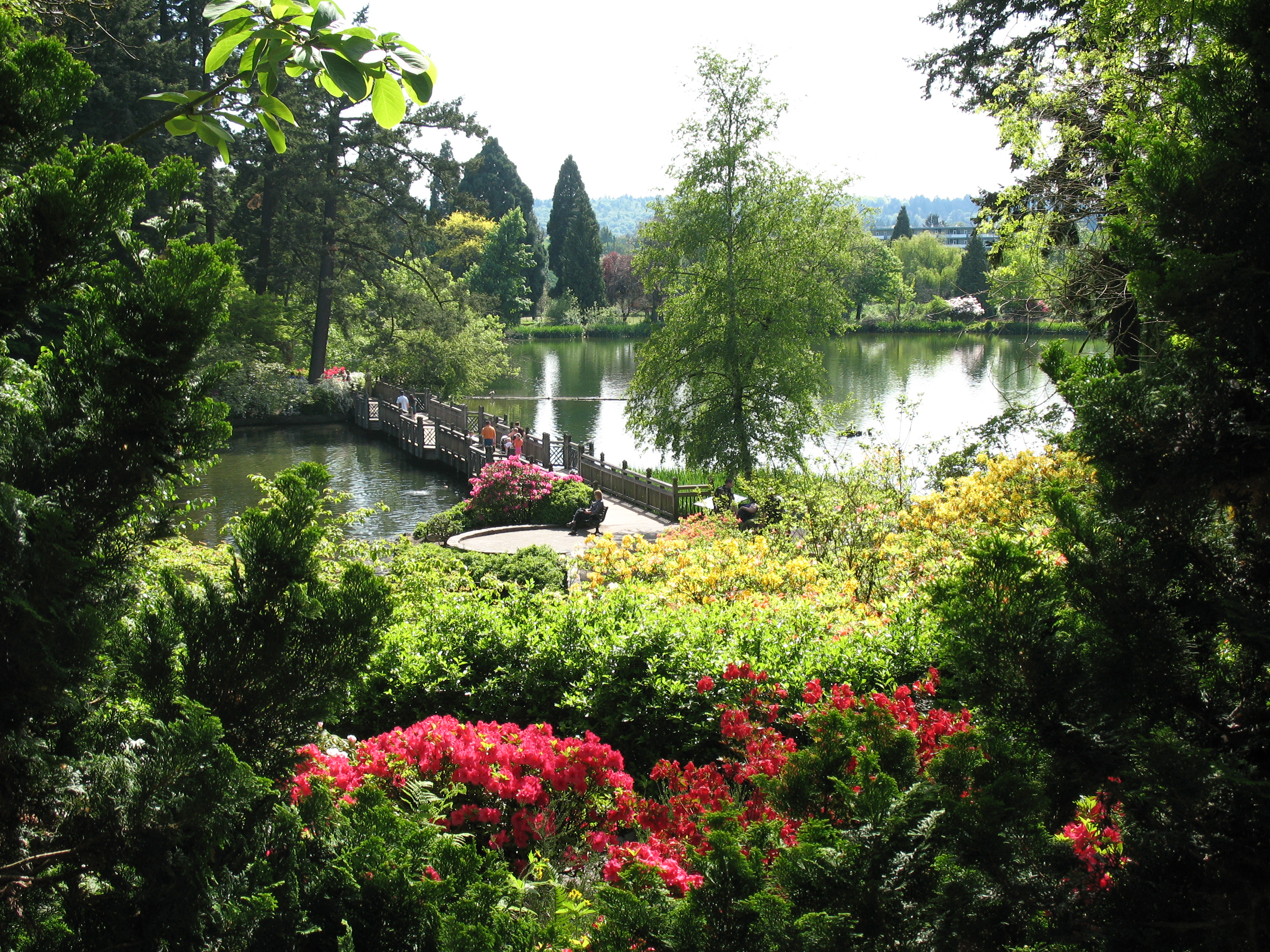
The Crystal Springs Rhododendron Garden (pictured in 2009) hosts a Mother's Day plant sale and show annually.

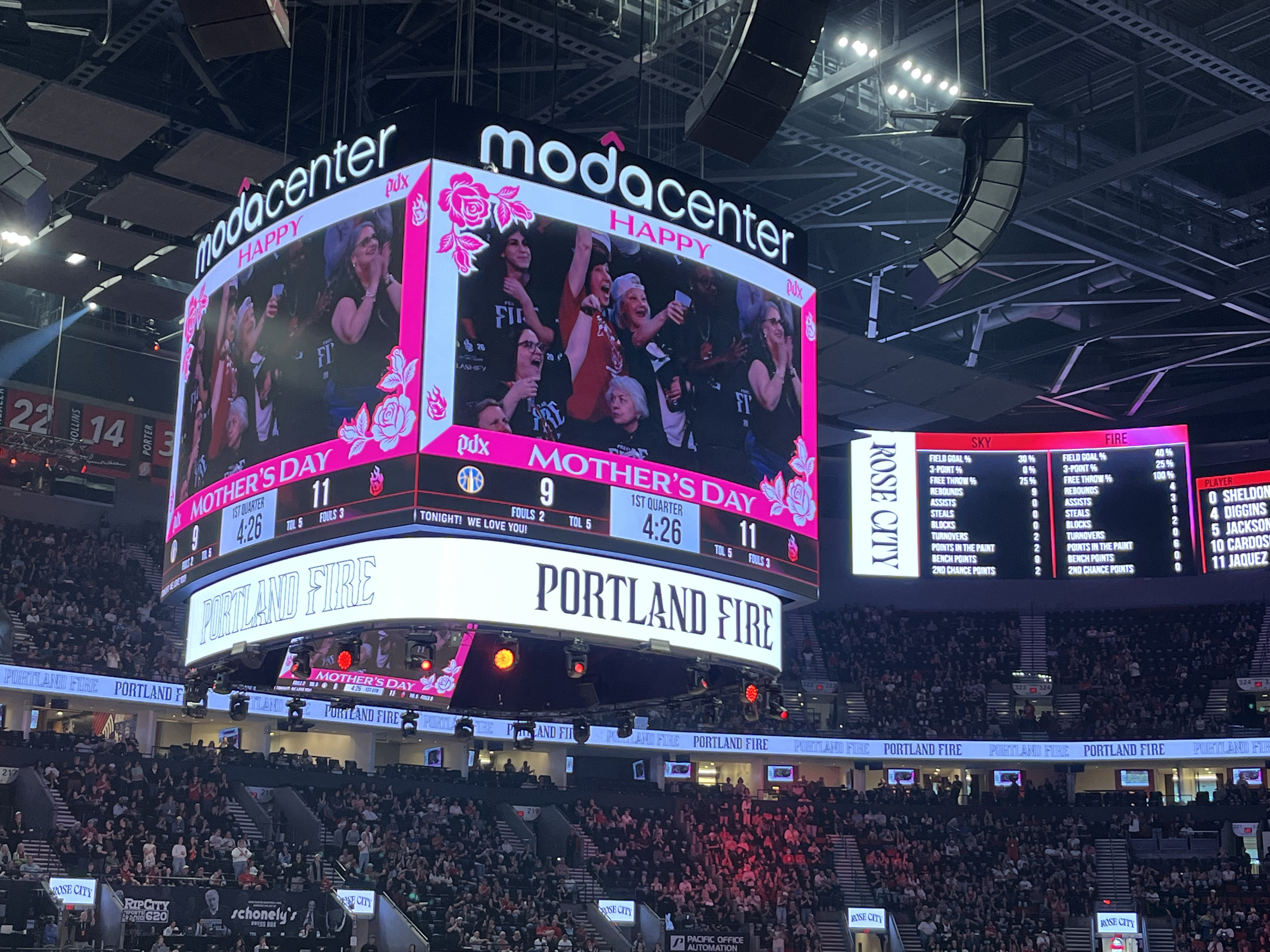
Mother's Day acknowledgement at the Portland Fire home opener, Moda Center, May 2026

Mother's Day is celebrated annually. The city has seen various events and activities to commemorate the holiday, including plant sales and shows, fun runs and fundraisers, train rides, and restaurant specials. The Crystal Springs Rhododendron Garden in Southeast Portland hosts an annual Mother's Day Sale and Show. The holiday plant sale was online during the pandemic. The annual Run Mama Run, organized by Family Forward Action, is held on Mother's Day. The 2016 event at Mount Tabor Park in Southeast Portland included a 5K run and a 10K run, plus a race for children and other activities, including crafts, flower planting, and yoga. Portland Monthly's Mother's Day Festival in 2018 featured a 5K run, a 10K run, and the Woman Up Festival. For multiple years, the Portland Beardsmen have delivered Mother's Day bouquets as part of a fundraiser for local nonprofit organization The Uprise Books Project. Oaks Amusement Park has offered free rides to mothers on the holiday. PCC has also hosted a Mother's Day plant sale.

In 2022, the Oregon Rail Heritage Center hosted train rides along the Springwater Corridor for Mother's Day, which included a dessert buffet and free mimosas for mothers. In 2025, Portland Thorns FC commemorated the holiday by hosting a fundraiser for PDX Diaper Bank billed as the "world's largest baby shower". Additionally, a gardening class at one local middle school organized a plant sale fundraiser around Mother's Day, in an attempt to address funding cuts in Portland Public Schools. The city has also seen demonstrations and other community gatherings on the holiday. Approximately 3,000 people participated in a Mother's Day peace walk during the Dalai Lama's visit to the city in 2001. In 2025, a Mother's Day vigil was held outside the Portland ICE facility. It was organized by Portland for Palestine to "honor detained mothers and demand an end to family separation, deportation and state sponsored violence".

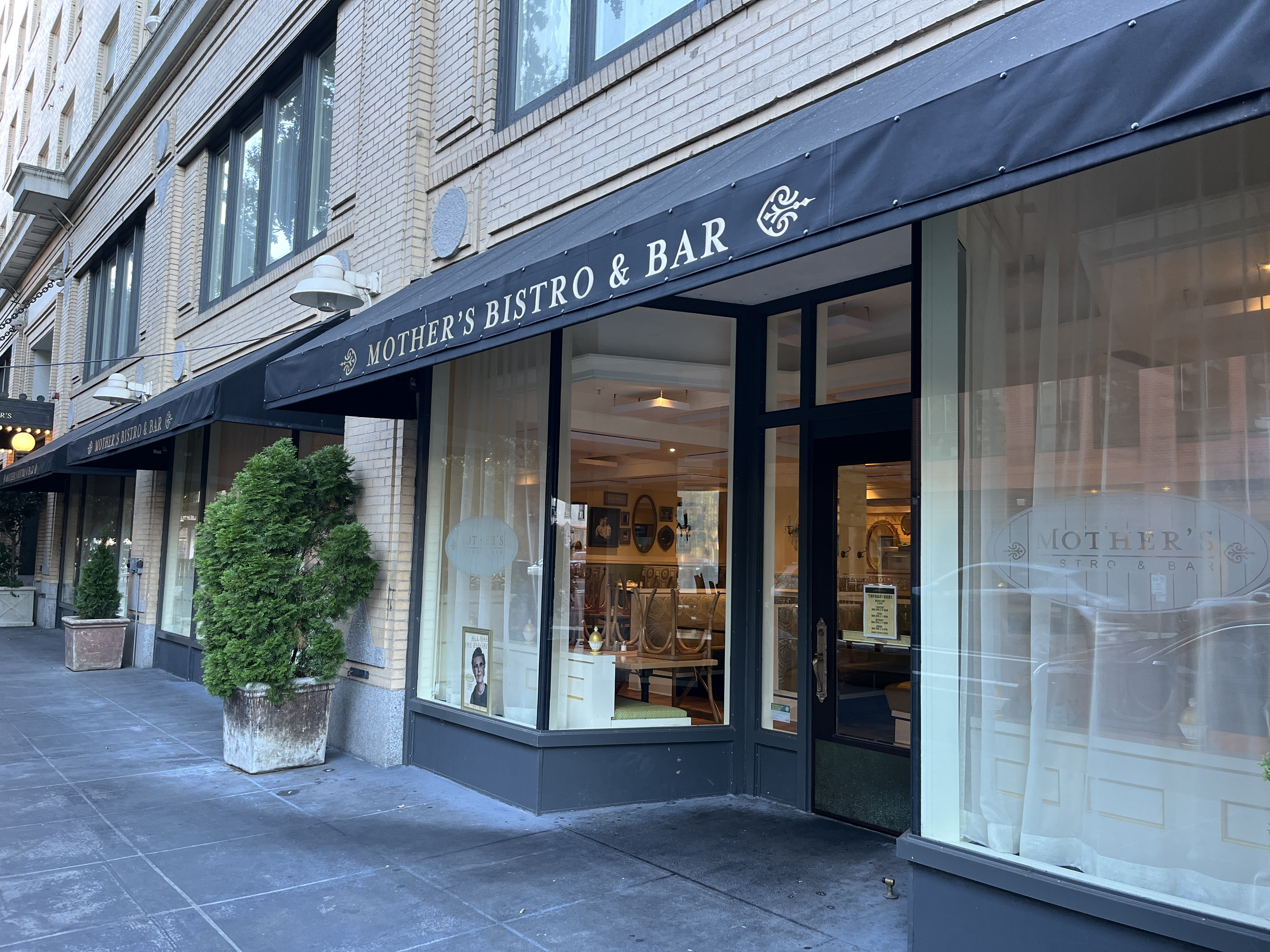
Mother's Bistro (exterior pictured in 2022) is among restaurants that have hosted brunch specials for Mother's Day.

Some local restaurants have hosted events or special menus for the holiday, including Andina, The Country Cat, Mother's Bistro, and Nuvrei. The defunct restaurant Bluehour hosted a holiday brunch in 2016. In 2018, the Oregon Zoo hosted a holiday brunch and Pix Pâtisserie hosted a tea. Arden Wine Bar and Kitchen, Bhuna, Normandie, and the Oregon Zoo all hosted specials for the holiday in 2019. In 2021, during the pandemic, Ava Gene's, Bullard Tavern, Cooperativa, Kachka, Montelupo Italian Market, Normandie, Olympia Provisions, Papa Haydn, Radar, RingSide Steakhouse, Sweedeedee, and Tusk were among restaurants offering Mother's Day picnic baskets, meal kits, and other cook-at-home options. Additionally, Salt & Straw debuted a series of four flower flavors to celebrate Mother's Day in 2021. In addition to Bullard Tavern, Multnomah Whiskey Library and Pink Rabbit hosted holiday brunches in 2023. Pinolo Gelato offered free scoops of gelato to mothers on the holiday in 2025. According to The Oregonian, Helen Bernhard Bakery has offered cakes with "elaborately piped flowers" for Mother's Day. The defunct JaCiva's Bakery and Chocolatier offered edible flower pot cakes for Mother's Day and Valentine's Day.

==== New Year's Eve ====
New Year's Eve is celebrated annually. The city has hosted a variety of events and activities that have commemorated the holiday, including balls and special dinners, concerts, drone light shows, and sobriety powwows.

==== Pi Day ====
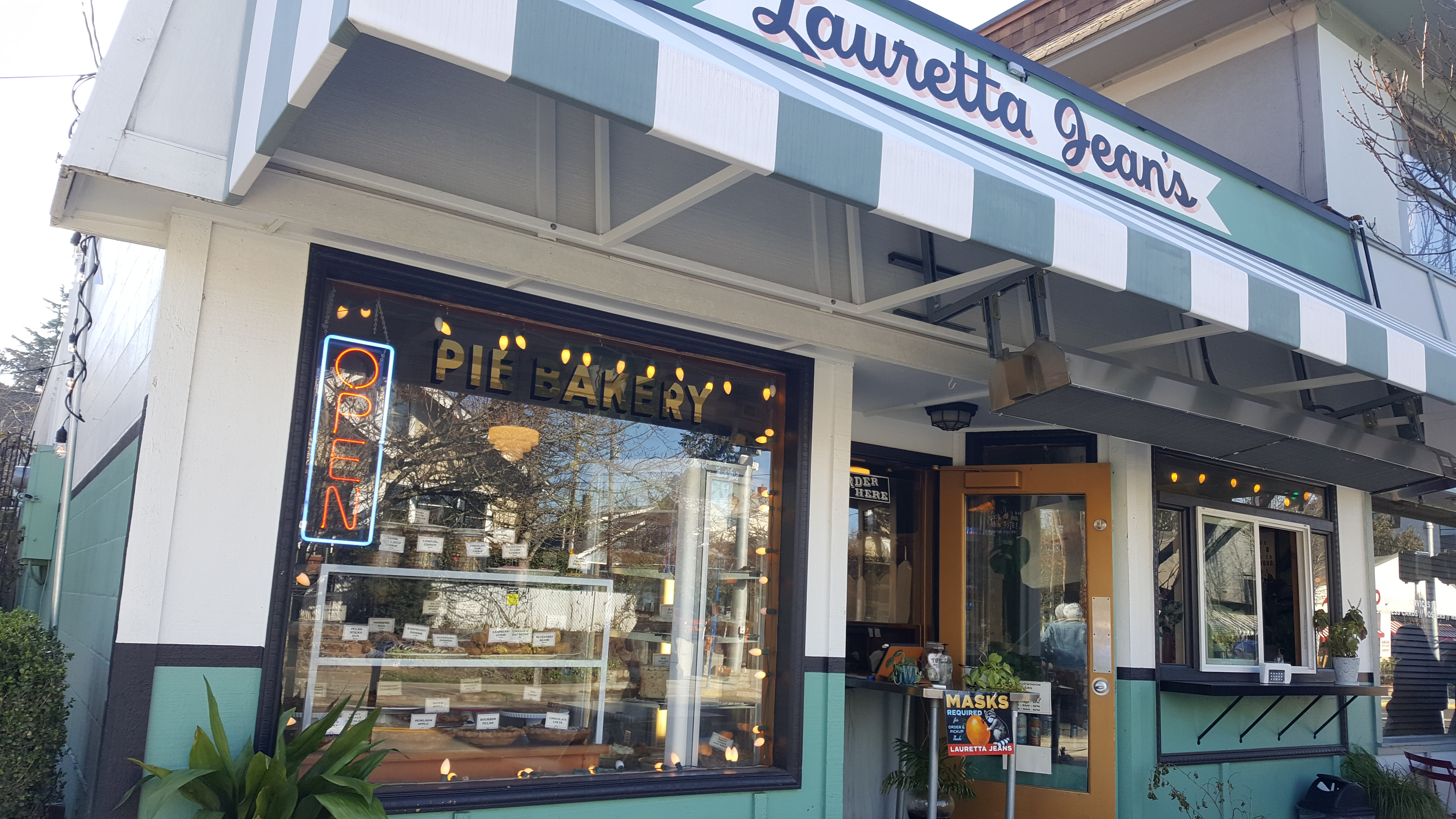
The bakery Lauretta Jean's (exterior pictured in 2022) offers special pie varieties for Pi Day annually.

Various events and activities have been held to celebrate Pi Day, a holiday invented by Larry Shaw. Some local celebrations have included people reciting many digits of pi as well as 3.14-mile runs. Some local restaurants also offer specials for the holiday, especially on pies and pizza pies.

Lewis & Clark College held a Pi Day celebration in 2009. In 2017, one local boy recited the first 400 digits of pi during his school's Pi Day celebration. Since c. 2019, a 3.14-mile run is held in Ladd's Addition. The runs often end at the bakery Lauretta Jean's, which sells pie. A Pi Day celebration was organized at Tōv Coffee, with participants invited to recite as many digits of pi as they could. Approximately two dozen people attended, and the organizers have also hosted pi-themed bicycle rides in the city.

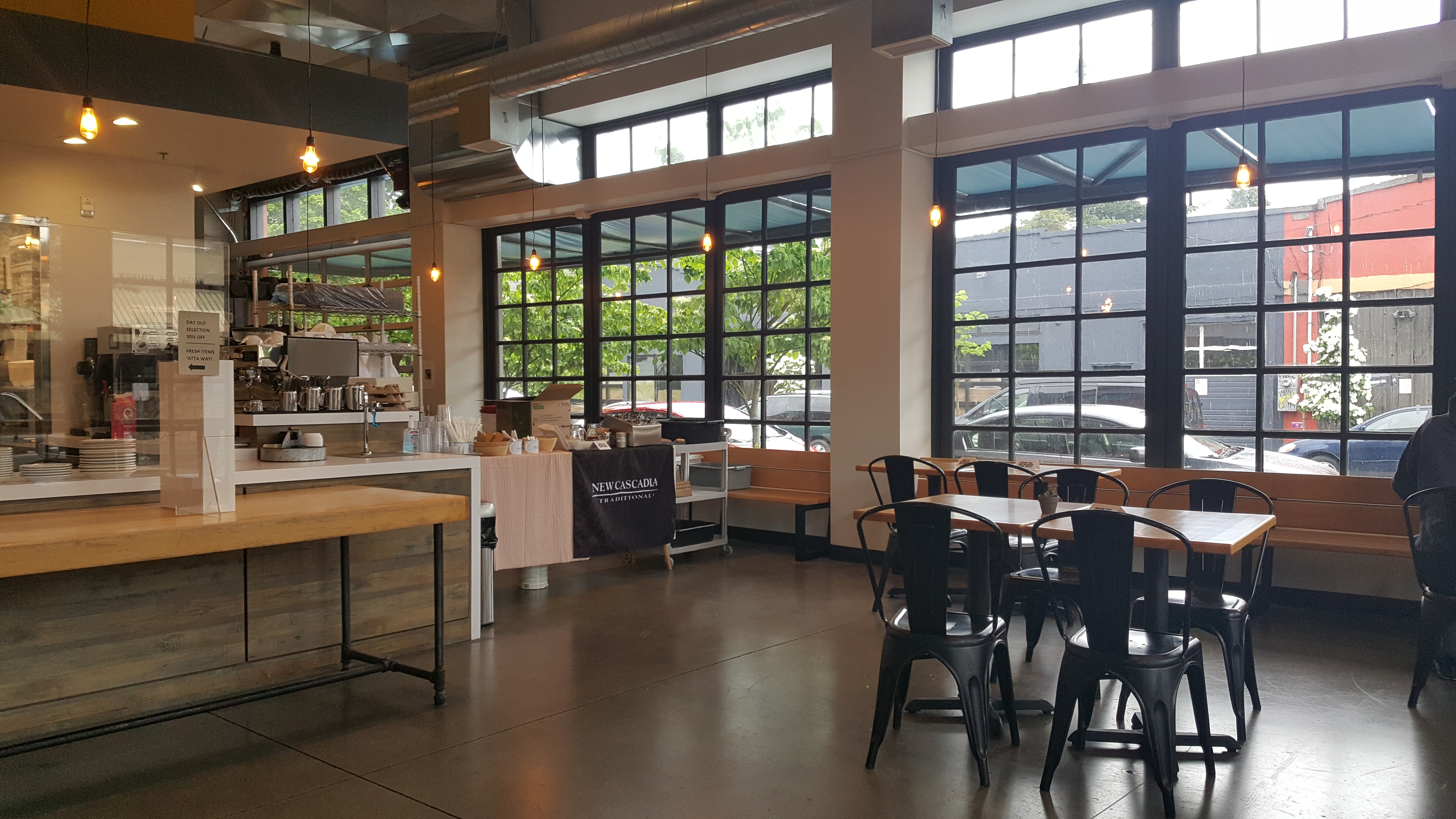
The bakery New Cascadia Traditional (interior pictured in 2022) has celebrated Pi Day by offering special pie varieties.

Some local businesses offer specials to celebrate the holiday such as limited menu items and discounts, especially on pies and pizza pies. Lauretta Jean's offers specials for the holiday annually. In 2013, the bakery's holiday celebration had live music and "pie-and-booze pairings". The salty grapefruit variety debuted in 2022. Ahead of the holiday in 2014, the bakery held a "March-Madness-style" pie bracket as well as food and drink specials. In 2023, Lauretta Jean's had special flavors, extended hours, and "mystery boxes" with slices of three surprise varieties. The "mystery boxes" returned in 2024. The bakery offered specials through the weekend for the first time in 2025. In 2026, Lauretta Jean's offered eight special flavors and made approximately 1,000 pies over the holiday weekend, twice that of a typically weekend.

In 2013, the now-defunct The Original Dinerant sold small pies and distributed free pie slices to who could answer questions asked on social media correctly. The bakery New Cascadia Traditional (NCT) held a week-long "Pie-A-Palooza" with special pie varieties to celebrate Pi Day in 2015. NCT held a Pi Week celebration in 2026, culminating with a sale on pies on Pi Day. The coffee shop Bipartisan Cafe offered discounts and special flavors for the holiday in 2024 and 2025. Helen Bernhard Bakery and Screen Door also offered holiday specials in 2026. Voodoo Doughnut offered banana cream pie doughnuts in 2026.

For Pi Day in 2016, The Oregonian held a poll for readers to vote for Oregon's best pie shop. The Portland location of Vancouver-based pizza restaurant chain Virtuous Pie offered a discount promotion in 2018. One local comedy club hosted a dinner party and comedy show on Pi Day in 2026, serving pizza pies to commemorate the holiday. The bakery and dessert shop Petunia's Pies & Pastries held a Pizza Pi Party in 2026.

==== Saint Patrick's Day ====
Saint Patrick's Day is a holiday celebrated annually. There is an annual themed festival at Tom McCall Waterfront Park. Established in 1979, the holiday-themed Shamrock Run is the largest running event in Oregon.

==== Star Wars Day ====
The unofficial observance Star Wars Day is an annual Star Wars-themed celebration. It is held on May 4, or "the fourth of May", which is a pun on "May the Fourth be with you", based on the franchise catchphrase "May the Force be with you". Portland has seen various activities organized for the observance. In 2015, Imperial Bottle Shop & Taproom had a celebration with film screenings and themed beers. The Portland Film Festival screened fan-made Star Wars films and had a costume contest at Mission Theater and Pub. In 2025, Kidical Mass PDX organized a family-friendly bicycle ride starting at Wilshire Park in Northeast Portland and featuring costumes and Star Wars music. A "night carnival" was held at Star Theater, featuring characters from the franchise performing cabaret, circus, and fringe acts. The bar Swan Dive in Southeast Portland hosted a Star Wars-themed burlesque brunch.

==== Ukrainian Day ====
Ukrainian Day is an annual festival established by the Ukrainian Foundation in 2006. It celebrates Ukrainian culture and features activities for children, dancing, food such as pierogies and pilaf, music, and performances. There are also classes and workshops, as well as handicraft. The event became annual in 2013. The 2020 and 2021 festivals were canceled because of the COVID-19 pandemic. The 2023 event was held at Westmoreland Park, in the Westmoreland district of the Sellwood-Moreland neighborhood. The presenting organization had a goal of collecting 1,000 tourniquets in 2025. The 2026 event at the same park was attended by hundreds of people. The foundation raised funds for medical supplies.

==== Valentine's Day ====
Valentine's Day is observed annually. Portland has seen various events and activities to celebrate, including kissing booths with animals, themed iterations of the Portland Night Market, dinner cruises on the Willamette River, and dining specials.

== LGBTQ ==
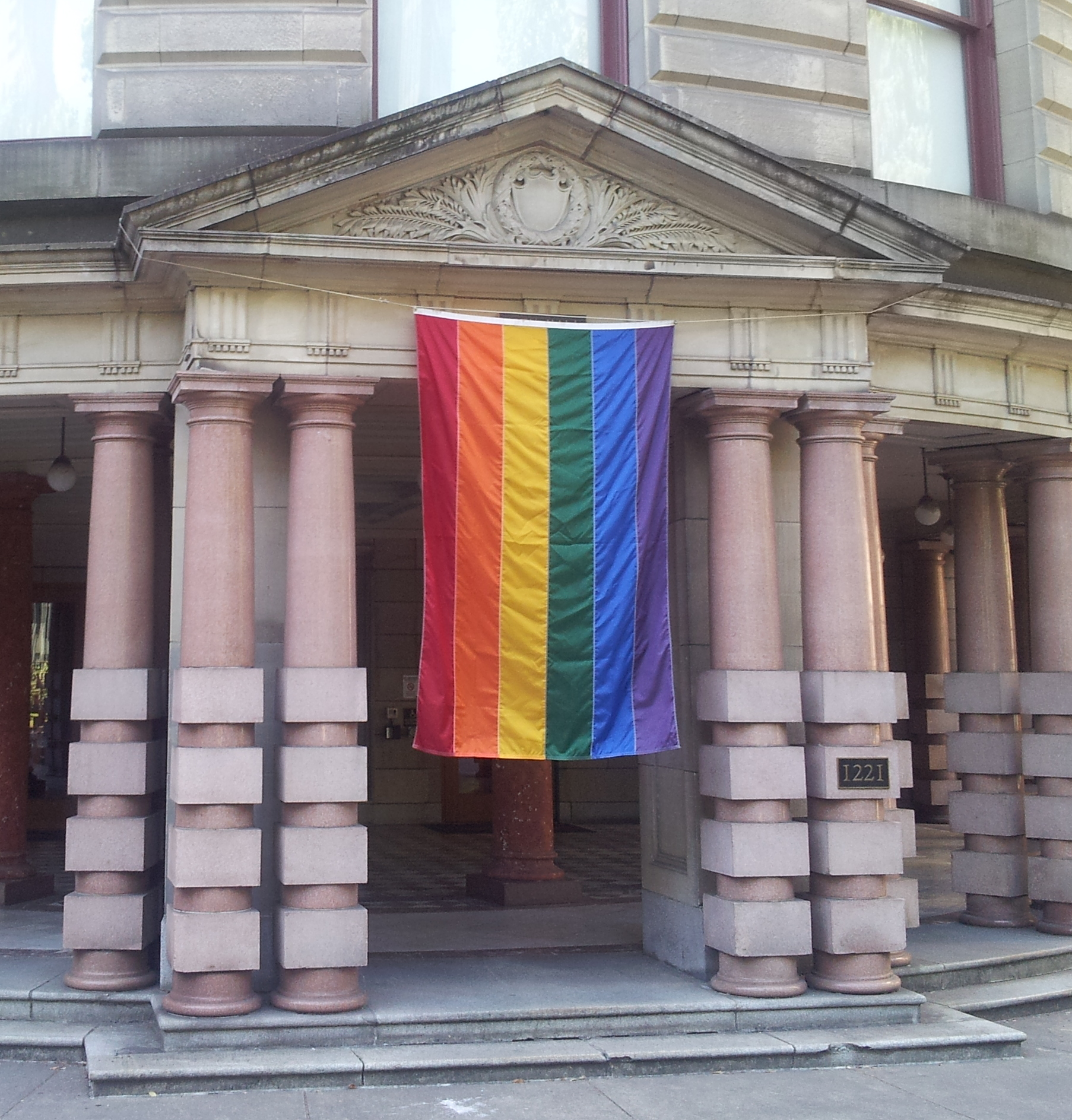
A rainbow pride flag at Portland City Hall on June 26, 2015, the day gay marriage was legalized in the U.S.

LGBTQ culture in Portland, Oregon is an important part of the culture of Oregon and broader Pacific Northwest culture. Portland ranked fourth in The Advocate's 2026 list of the fifteen safest American cities for LGBTQ+ travel, and in 2025, Lonely Planet featured Portland as one of the top fifty most queer-friendly cities in world in The LGBTQ+ Travel Guide. Portland scored 100 out of 100 on the Human Rights Campaign's Municipal Equality Index in 2025. Of all the large metropolitan areas in the United States, the Portland metropolitan area has the second-highest percent of LGBTQ adults per capita, with the Williams Institute reporting that 6.0% of Portland adults identify as LGBT as of 2021. The majority of the Portland area is located in Multnomah County, which has the highest concentration of lesbian couples of any U.S. county of the same size or larger as of 2024.

== Music ==
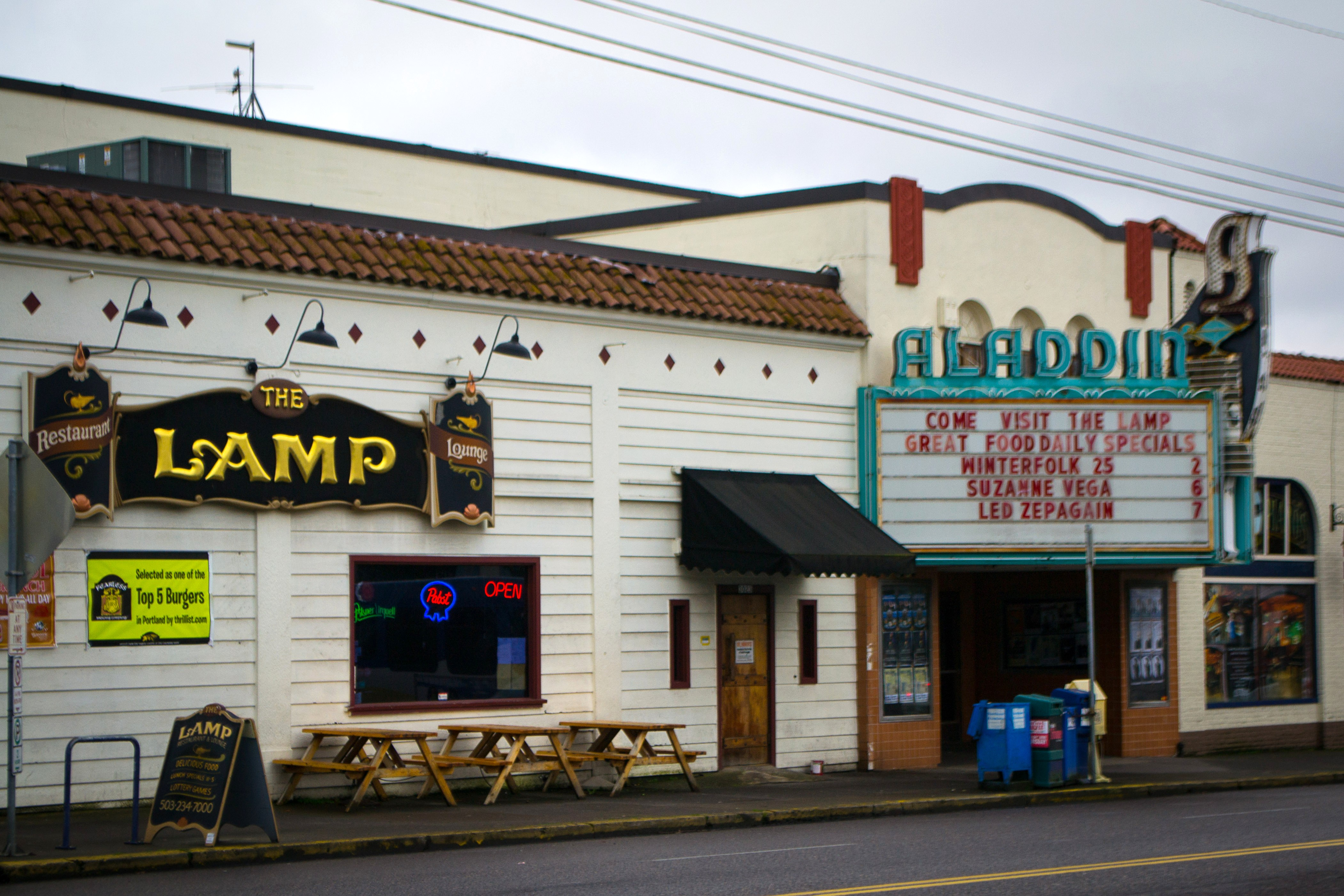
Aladdin Theater

Music festivals have included the Cathedral Park Jazz Festival, the Montavilla Jazz Festival, MusicfestNW, PDX Pop Now!, the Portland Jazz Festival, the Portland Music and Art Fair, the Portland Old-Time Music Gathering, the Portland's Folk Festival, Project Pabst, the Vanport Jazz Festival, and the Waterfront Blues Festival. The annual concert Tuba Christmas is held at Pioneer Courthouse Square and featured Christmas music.

Portland has many music venues, including: Aladdin Theater, Alberta Street Pub, Antoinette Hatfield Hall, Arlene Schnitzer Concert Hall, Crystal Ballroom, Dante's, Doug Fir Lounge, Hawthorne Theatre, Holocene, Jack London Revue, Keller Auditorium, Lola's Room, Mississippi Studios, Moda Center, Revolution Hall, Roseland Theater, Spare Room, Star Theater, Veterans Memorial Coliseum, Wonder Ballroom, and World Famous Kenton Club. Defunct music venues include: Analog Café and Theater, Backspace, Berbati's Pan, Blue Monk, Brasserie Montmartre, Candlelight Cafe & Bar, The Dude Ranch, Jimmy Mak's, The Know,La Luna, The Liquor Store, Lollipop Shoppe, No Vacancy Lounge, Paris Theatre, Satyricon, Tonic Lounge, and X-Ray Cafe.

=== Record Store Day ===
The city has celebrated Record Store Day since the event was established in the 2000s. Participating businesses have included 2nd Avenue Records, Jackpot Records, and Music Millennium, the founder of which helped start the event. In 2026, Jordan Michelman of Willamette Week said the city "offers a particular paradise for the vinyl enthusiast, a store for any proclivity and genre". Michelman also wrote that "here in Portland, every day is Record Store Day".

== Religion ==
Religious affiliation in Portland metro (2024)
Unaffiliated	42%
Protestant Christian	25%
Catholic	11%
Latter-day Saint/Mormon	4%
Other Christian	2%
Unitarians and New Age faiths	6%
Jewish	2%
Buddhist	2%
Hindu	2%
Muslim	1%
Other faiths	1%

Historically, Portland, Oregon has been a religious city. In modern times, however, it has become the least religious city in the United States. According to the 2024 Pew Research Center Religious Landscape Study, 44% of people in the Portland area in 2024 identified as "unaffiliated," tied with Seattle, and 2% higher than San Francisco. Specifically, 21% identify as "nothing in particular," 12% as atheists, and 9% as agnostic.

According to the same study, 42% of the Portland area identifies as Christian, with 25% identifying as some kind of Protestant, 11% identifying as Catholic, and 4% identifying as Latter-day Saint (Mormon). About 2% fall into other Christian categories. About 5% identify as "Unitarians, other liberal faiths, and new age religions." 8% fall into other religious categories, including Islam, Judaism, Buddhism, and Hinduism.

== Sports ==
Portland, Oregon, United States, is home to two teams from the major professional sports leagues in the United States and Canada — the Portland Trail Blazers of the National Basketball Association (NBA) and the Portland Timbers of Major League Soccer (MLS). In women's major leagues, the city hosts the Portland Fire of the Women's National Basketball Association (WNBA) and Portland Thorns FC of the National Women's Soccer League (NWSL). Portland also hosts a wide variety of other sports and sporting events.

Cycling events have included Bike Summer, the Cross Crusade, the Ladds 500, the Portland Criterium, Sunday Parkways, the World Naked Bike Ride, Providence Bridge Pedal, the Worst Day of the Year Ride, and Zoobomb.

== Theatre ==
Theatre organizations have included Hand2Mouth Theatre, Imago Theatre, Milagro, Portland Center Stage, Stark Raving Theatre, Tears of Joy Theatre, and Triangle Productions.

== Video games ==
The Portland Retro Gaming Expo is at the Oregon Convention Center.

== See also ==
- Culture of Oregon
