= Montavilla Jazz Festival =

Annual event in Portland, Oregon, U.S.

- The festival's logo

- Billboard promoting the festival, 2026
- Frequency: Annually
- Locations: Montavilla, Portland, Oregon
- Country: United States
- Website: montavillajazz.org

The Montavilla Jazz Festival is an annual jazz festival in the Montavilla neighborhood of Portland, Oregon, United States. It features local musicians performing original music. It has been described as a project of the Montavilla Neighborhood Association and as a neighborhood celebration. Some local restaurants offer discounts to festival participants.

Mel Brown performed at the festival in 2019. Venues in 2023 included Alberta Rose Theatre and Portland Metro Arts. Mt. Tabor Park's Caldera Amphitheater was among venues in 2024. The 2025 event had 26 concerts at five venues over three days.

Fritz Hirsch was the festival's managing director in 2016. Neil Mattson is the festival's executive director.

== See also ==
- Culture of Portland, Oregon
- List of festivals in the United States
  - List of music festivals in the United States
- List of jazz festivals
