= Candlelight Cafe & Bar =

Defunct bar and restaurant in Portland, Oregon, U.S.

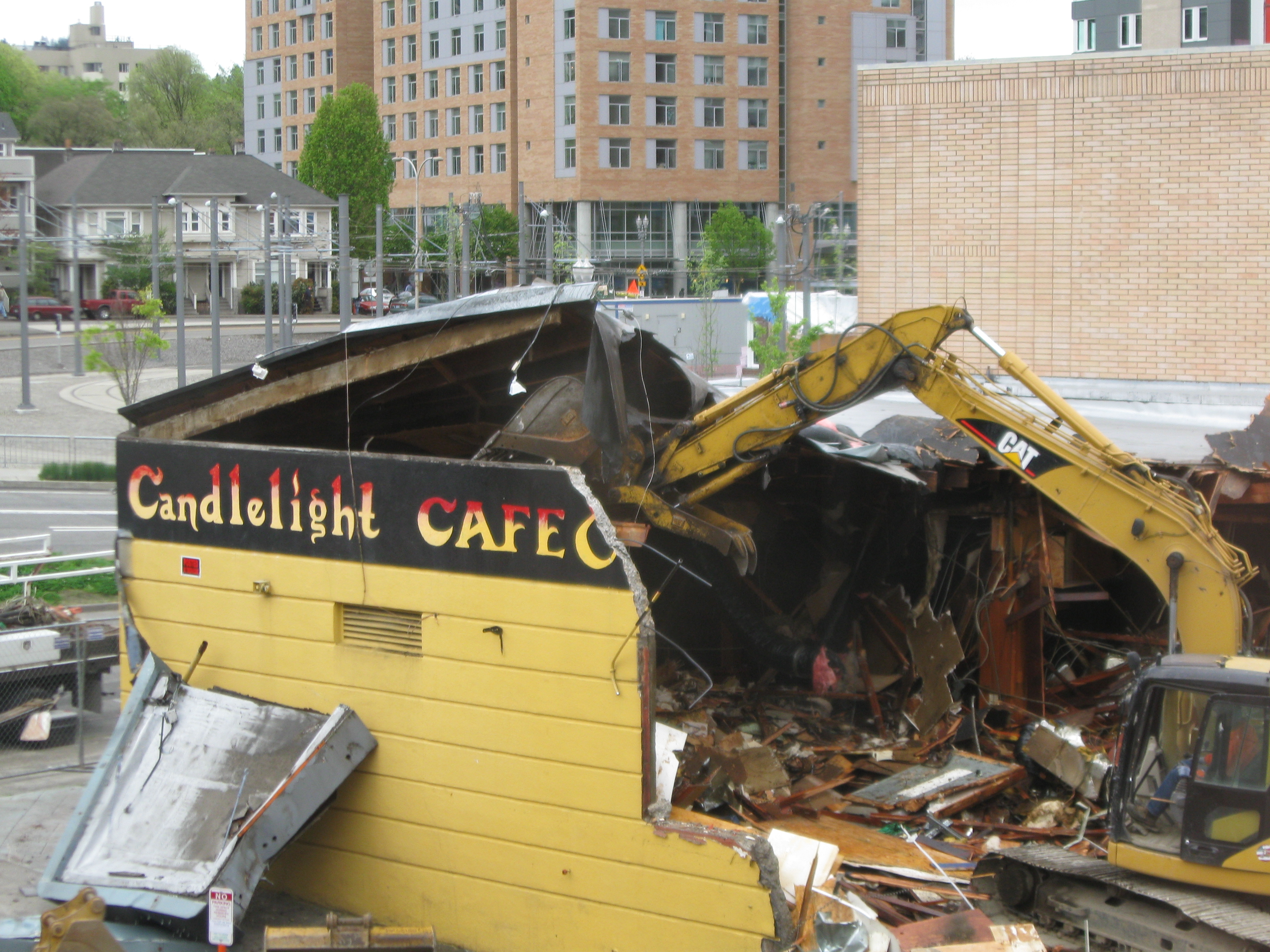
- The restaurant's demolition in 2012
- Interactive map of Candlelight Cafe & Bar
- Address: 2032 SW 5th Ave.
- Location: Portland, Oregon, United States
- Coordinates: 45°30′29″N 122°40′58″W
- Owner: Joe Shore

Construction
- Opened: 1984
- Closed: 2012

The Candlelight Cafe & Bar, also known as the Candlelight Room, was a blues bar and restaurant located at Southwest 5th and Lincoln in downtown Portland, Oregon, United States.

== Description and history ==
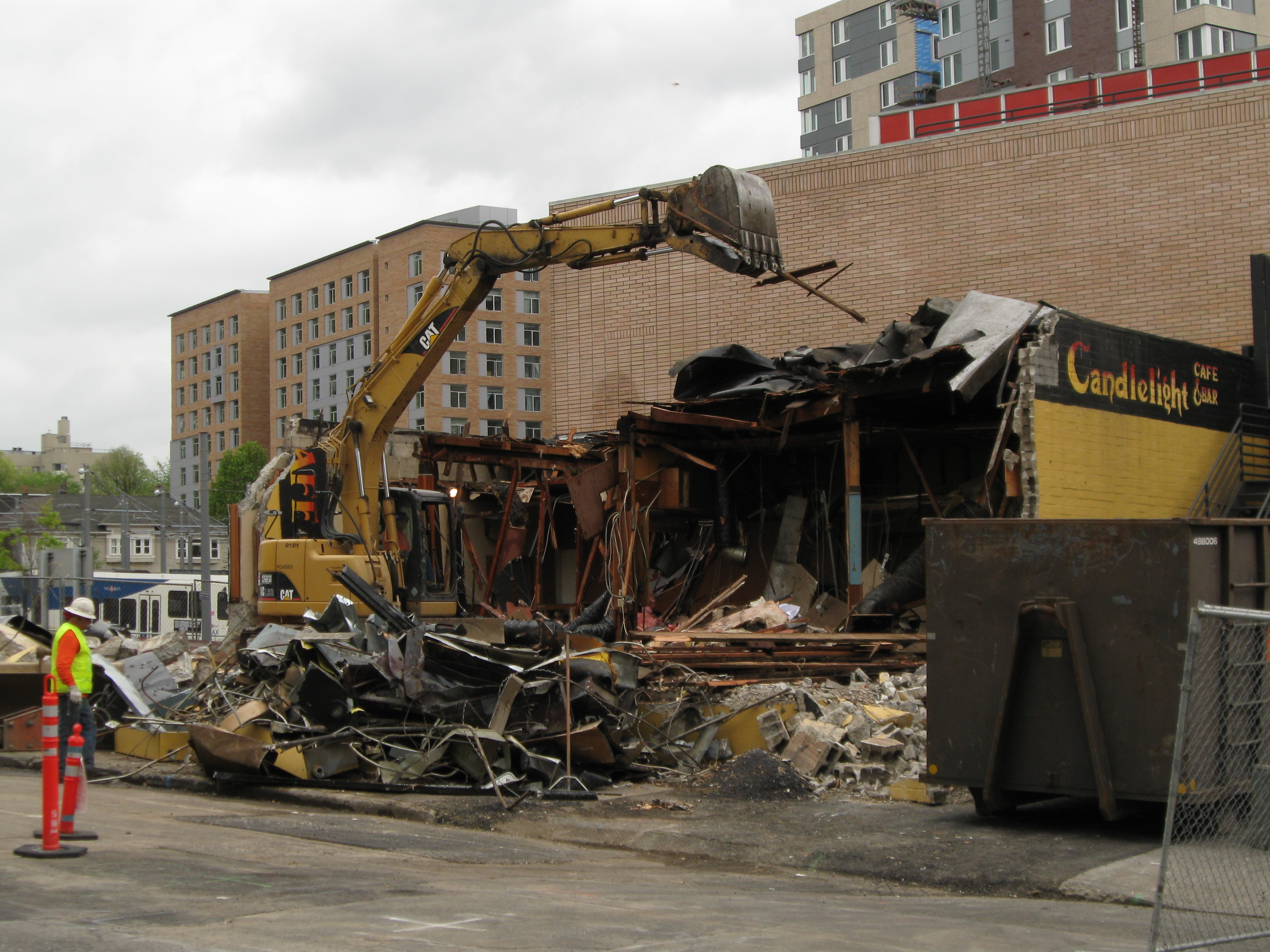
Demolition, 2012

The business operated for 28 years, from 1984 to 2012, and was known for live blues and R&B performances each day of the week.

Candlelight was owned by Joe Shore and later operated by his daughter, Janelle Shore. In 2012, MAX Orange Line construction caused the venue to be demolished. The Shores had hoped to relocate the business, which included a record label, to northwest Portland.

The 2018 Waterfront Blues Festival honored the Candlelight, and featured performances by many of its regular musicians.

== See also ==
- Culture of Portland, Oregon
