= Bike Summer =

Cycling festival in Portland, Oregon, U.S.

- Logo
- Status: Active
- Frequency: Annually
- Location: Portland, Oregon
- Country: United States
- Inaugurated: 2002
- Website: bike-summer.org

Bike Summer, also known as Pedalpalooza, is a months-long cycling festival in Portland, Oregon, United States. The festival was established in 2002 and features hundreds of themed events. Organizers have described Bike Summer as an "open source festival" because of its inclusive nature, with activities held from June through August. Participants sometimes wear costumes.

The cycling advocacy group Shift 2 Bikes is among organizers. The 2020 event was cancelled because of the COVID-19 pandemic. There were Star Wars- and Taylor Swift-themed rides in 2021. The 2022 event included a new Native and Indigenous Pedalpalooza. There was a "Pure Moods" ride in 2025. There have also been rides with themes based on Dr. Seuss, Star Trek, and The Big Lebowski.

== See also ==
- Culture of Portland, Oregon
- List of festivals in the United States
- Transportation in Portland, Oregon
