= Portland Criterium =

Annual cycling event in Portland, Oregon, U.S.

- Logo
- Status: Active
- Frequency: Annually
- Location: Portland, Oregon
- Country: United States
- Website: portlandcriterium.com

The Portland Criterium is an annual cycling event in Portland, Oregon, United States. The event "embraces competition and intensity", according to the Portland Mercury.

The event was restarted in 2022. Jonathan Maus of BikePortland said its return "shows that Portland's elected officials have finally come back around to the idea that cycling can be a powerful tool not only for urban mobility, but as a means to bring people together and rediscover our city’s swagger".

The 2024 event had a race around the North Park Blocks in the Pearl District. Approximately 300 people participated in the 2025 event, which circled the North Park Blocks. The two-day event in 2026 had routes circling the North Park Blocks and the Lloyd Center. Hundreds of people participated.

== See also ==
- Culture of Portland, Oregon
