= Northwest Museum of Cartoon Arts =

Comics museum in Portland, Oregon, U.S.

- Location: 322 Northwest 8th Avenue, Portland, Oregon, United States
- Coordinates: 45°31′32″N 122°40′42″W
- Website: nwmoca.org

The Northwest Museum of Cartoon Arts was a nonprofit organization and comics museum in Portland, Oregon, United States. It opened in November 2025 and closed permanently in 2026. Prior to opening, the organization hosted pop-up exhibits. Michael Rosen was the chair of the board of directors.

The Pacific Northwest in Comics was the debut exhibit.

== See also ==
- Culture of Portland, Oregon
- List of museums in Portland, Oregon
