= Portland Seafood and Wine Festival =

Annual event in Portland, Oregon, U.S.

- Logo
- Frequency: Annually
- Location: Portland, Oregon
- Country: United States
- Website: pdxseafoodandwinefestival.com

The Portland Seafood and Wine Festival is an annual event in Portland, Oregon, United States. Established in 2006 to benefit the Oregon chapter of National Multiple Sclerosis Society, it is held at the Portland Expo Center. Sean Guard is the owner and director. The event has also been held at the Oregon Convention Center.

== Description ==
The family-friendly festival features seafood such as crayfish, Dungeness crab, and lobster, as well as wine. There are also puppet shows and food competitions, such as an oyster shucking and eating contest and a celebrity crab cracking contest.

== History ==
The 2019 event had 175 exhibitors. The 2026 event had live music and representation from 30 wineries.

== See also ==
- Culture of Portland, Oregon
- Food festival
- List of festivals in the United States
