= Cross Crusade =

American cycling race series

The Cyclocross Crusade, currently in season 33, is a cyclo-cross race series based in Portland, Oregon held over an eight-week period during the months of October and November. As of 2005, the series was the largest cyclo-cross series in the United States. The 2006 series consisted of six races plus the U.S. Gran Prix of Cyclocross final (a Union Cycliste Internationale (UCI) sanctioned event). The Cross Crusade began hosting UCI-sanctioned events as part of the series in 2002.

The first Cross Crusade was held in 1993, and was an expansion of a three-race series called First Mud, which had only included elite participants, and which had been held since the mid-1980s.

There were no races in 2020 caused by the COVID-19 pandemic. That was deferred to 2021.

== See also ==
- Culture of Portland, Oregon
