= Portland Music and Art Fair =

1970 rock festival in Portland, Oregon, U.S.

- Date: 1970
- Location: Portland, Oregon, U.S.
- Type: Rock festival

The Portland Music and Art Fair was a rock festival held in Portland, Oregon, United States, in 1970.

== See also ==
- Culture of Portland, Oregon
- List of festivals in the United States
  - List of music festivals in the United States
