= Hand2Mouth Theatre =

Theatre ensemble in Portland, Oregon, U.S.

Hand2Mouth Theatre is theatre ensemble based in Portland, Oregon. The group collaboratively create their performances, and evolve all language, movement, and design elements themselves—instead of working from a pre-written script.

Since 2006, Hand2Mouth has also run a youth education program in the Portland area.

== Influences ==
Hand2Mouth Theatre are influenced by the work of Forced Entertainment, Elevator Repair Service, and Jerzy Grotowski.

== History ==
Jonathan Walters founded Hand2Mouth in 2000 after training with street theatre troupe Teatr Biuro Podrozy in Poland. As of 2009, Hand2Mouth has created 15 original performances, and the ensemble has grown to include a core of company members and associate artists. Company members have traveled and studied in London, New York, Poland, Denmark and Mexico City.

== Performance Development Process ==
Hand2Mouth actors, dramaturgs, and designers collaboratively develop the performances utilizing a combination of long form improvisations, movement, dance, singing, and discussion. Each collaborator contributes researched material through these means. Design elements can result from experimentation and improvisation of materials, set, lighting, sound, music and various objects brought to the stage.

== Performance History ==
- 2002 - Blue Mountain Community College, Pendelton, OR (Jerusalem)
- 2003 - River Theatre, Astoria, OR (Posture Queen)
- 2004 - Open Theatre International Festival, Katowice, Poland (Blue with Stacja Szamocin)
- 2004 - Pablo Neruda Centenary Festival, Portland State University, Portland, OR (Slender with Carpetbag Brigade)
- 2004 - PuppetLove! Festival, San Francisco, CA (The Wild Child)
- 2004 - River Theatre, Astoria, OR (Thirst)
- 2005 - Festival Malta, Poznan, Poland (Blue with Stacja Szamocin)
- 2005 - Kalisz Theatre Festival, Kalisz, Poland (Blue with Stacja Szamocin)
- 2005 - Edmonds Community College, Seattle, WA (The Wild Child)
- 2005 - Willamette University, Salem, OR (The Wild Child)
- 2006 - Just Add Water Festival, Portland Center Stage, Portland, OR (After Hours)
- 2007 - On the Boards, Seattle, WA (Repeat After Me)
- 2007 - Time-Based Art Festival, Portland Institute for Contemporary Art, Portland, OR (Repeat After Me)
- 2007 - Northwest New Works Festival, On the Boards, Seattle, WA (Repeat After Me - excerpt)
- 2008 - Myrna Loy Center, Helena, MT (Repeat After Me)
- 2008 - Bumbershoot Arts Festival, Seattle, WA (Project X: You Are Here)
- 2008 - NW New Works Festival, Seattle, WA (Undine)
- 2008 - 10 Tiny Dances, Portland, OR (Project X: You Are Here)
- 2009 - Fury Festival, Fury Factory, San Francisco, CA (Repeat After Me)
- 2015 - Time, A Fair Hustler, Fertile Ground Festival, Portland, OR.

== See also ==
- Culture of Portland, Oregon
