= Worst Day of the Year Ride =

Annual cycling event in Portland, Oregon, U.S.

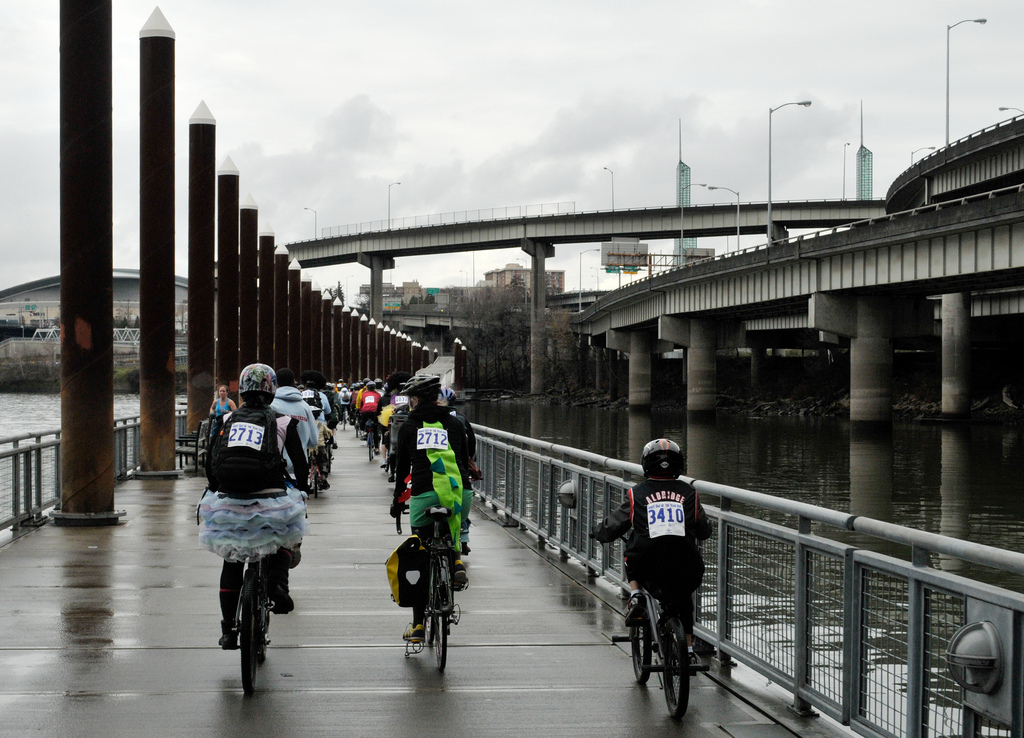
- Ride participants in 2010
- Status: Active
- Frequency: Annually
- Location: Portland, Oregon
- Country: United States
- Participants: 3,500 (2010)
- Website: worstdayride.com

The Worst Day of the Year Ride is an annual cycling event in Portland, Oregon, United States.

== Description and history ==
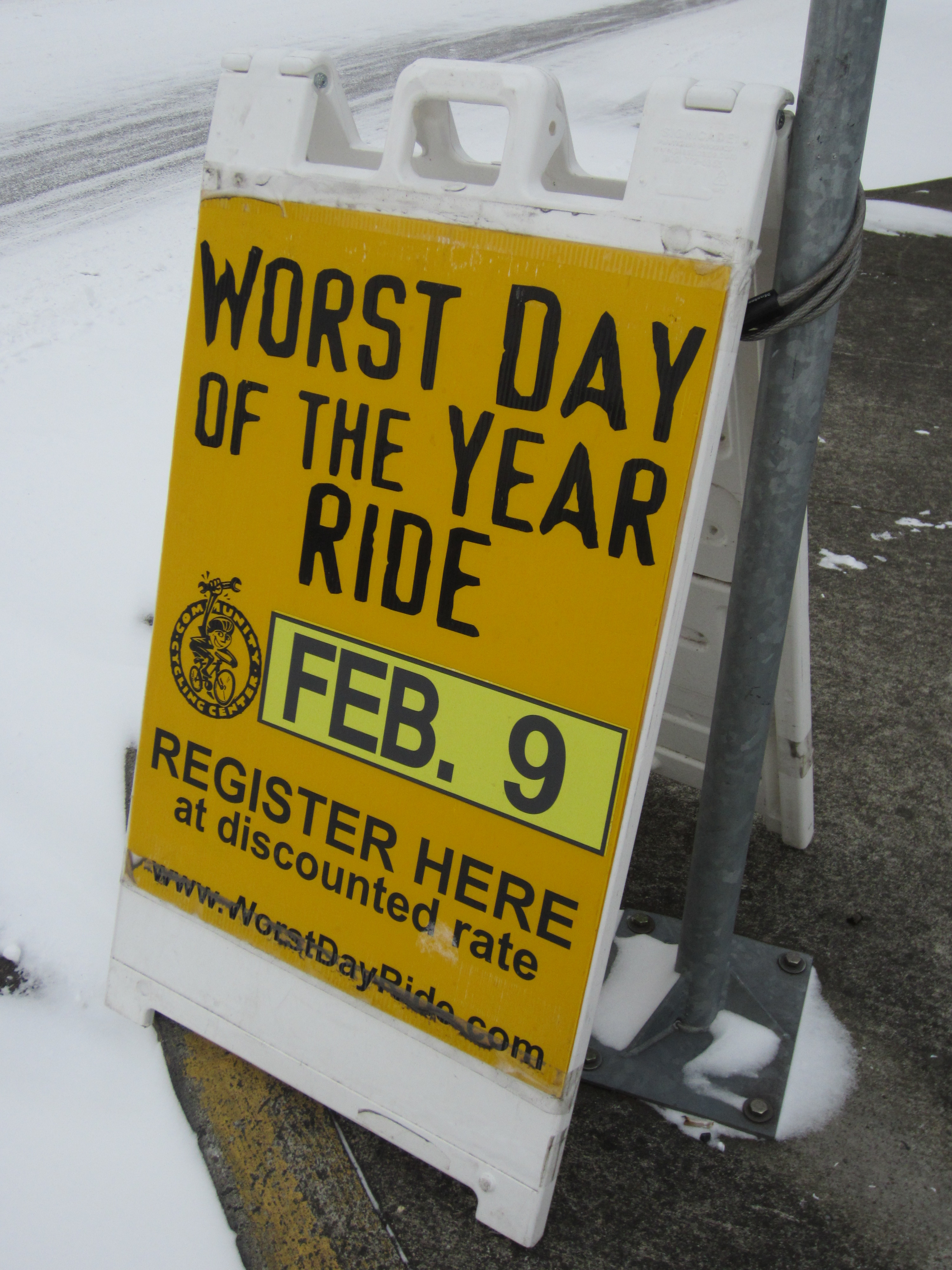
Sign for the 2014 ride

The ride, supposedly timed to the worst weather day of the year, has been called a "statement that bikers in Portland are willing to put tire to road regardless of how awful and depressing the weather may be". Riders pay to participate. It is common for cyclists to wear costumes. Race organizers started a costume contest and the event has been called a "winter Halloween for cyclists". The Worst Day of the Year Ride usually offers two courses, an approximately 18-mile urban route and a 40-mile or longer, more challenging route. The event attracts cyclists from surrounding cities, including Eugene. It has benefited the Community Cycling Center's bicycle programs.

The event's popularity has increased over time. 250 people participated in the inaugural ride. The 2006 ride attracted 1,500 participants. In 2010, the ride was held on Valentine's Day and attracted 3,500 participants, making it the second most popular bike event behind Bridge Pedal, which attracts more than 20,000 attendees (this does not include the city's World Naked Bike Ride, which is not officially sanctioned). In 2014, The Oregonian reported that the ride typically attracts 4,000 participants.

Despite the event's name, according to organizers it "never really rained" for the first thirteen years the race was held. In 2014, the more challenging 45-mile route was canceled "for safety reasons" due to bad weather. Event organizers tweeted, "For the 1st time in 13 years, the ride IS going to be the worst! For safety reasons, the challenge is closing. Urban will remain open", referring to the 18-mile urban route.
