= List of jazz venues in the United States =

This is a list of notable American venues where jazz music is, or has been, played. It includes jazz clubs, nightclubs, dancehalls and historic venues as well.

== Alabama ==
- Carver Theatre, Birmingham

== California ==
- Lobero Theater, Santa Barbara

=== Los Angeles metropolitan area ===
- The Baked Potato, Studio City
- Billy Berg's, Hollywood
- Catalina Bar & Grill, Hollywood
- Donte's, North Hollywood
- Dunbar Hotel, Central Avenue
- The Haig, Hollywood
- Herb Alpert's Vibrato Grill & Jazz, Bel Air
- Jazz Bakery, Culver City
- Lighthouse Cafe, Hermosa Beach
- Lincoln Theater, Central Avenue
- Quality Cafe, Downtown
- Tiffany Club, Wilshire District
- Blue Whale, Little Tokyo

=== San Francisco Bay Area ===
- Bach Dancing & Dynamite Society, Half Moon Bay
- Black Hawk, Tenderloin, San Francisco
- Great American Music Hall, Tenderloin, San Francisco
- Keystone Korner, North Beach, San Francisco
- Maybeck Recital Hall, Berkeley
- Jazz Workshop, San Francisco
- SF Jazz Center, San Francisco
- Yoshi's Jazz Club, Jack London Square, Oakland

== District of Columbia ==
- Blues Alley, Georgetown, Washington
- Bohemian Caverns, U Street, Washington
- Howard Theatre, Shaw, Washington
- Krazy Kat Klub, Downtown, Washington
- Lincoln Theatre, U Street, Washington
- Republic Gardens, U Street, Washington

== Georgia ==
- Eddie's Attic, Decatur

== Hawaii ==
- Blue Note Hawaii, Waikiki, Honolulu

== Illinois ==
- Evanston S.P.A.C.E., Evanston

=== Chicago ===
- Andy's Jazz Club
- The Black Orchid
- Club DeLisa
- Constellation Jazz Club
- Friar's Inn (1920s)
- Green Mill Cocktail Lounge
- HotHouse
- The Jazz Showcase
- Kelly's Stables
- London House
- Macomba Lounge
- Rhumboogie Café
- Regal Theater
- Sunset Cafe
- Sutherland Lounge
- The Velvet Lounge

== Indiana ==
- Jazz Kitchen, Indianapolis

== Louisiana ==
- Lulu White's Mahogany Hall, Storyville, New Orleans
- Maple Leaf Bar, Uptown, New Orleans
- Mother-in-Law Lounge, Tremé, New Orleans
- Preservation Hall, French Quarter, New Orleans
- Snug Harbor, Faubourg Marigny, New Orleans
- Tipitina's, Uptown, New Orleans

== Maryland ==
- Keystone Korner, Baltimore

== Massachusetts ==
- Iron Horse Music Hall, Northampton
- Ryles Jazz Club, Cambridge

=== Boston ===
- Scullers Jazz Club, Allston, Boston
- Southland
- Storyville
- Wally's Cafe

== Michigan ==
=== Detroit ===
- Baker's Keyboard Lounge
- Blue Bird Inn
- Cliff Bell's
- Orchestra Hall, or Paradise Theater

== Minnesota ==
- Artists' Quarter, Saint Paul
- Dakota Jazz Club, Minneapolis

== Missouri ==
- Peacock Alley, St. Louis

== Nebraska ==
- Dreamland Ballroom, North Omaha

== Nevada ==
- Cappozoli's, Las Vegas

== New Jersey ==
=== Newark, New Jersey ===
- Sparky J's, later renamed the Cadillac Club
- Key Club

== New York ==
- Jazz Forum, Tarrytown

=== New York City ===
==== Manhattan ====
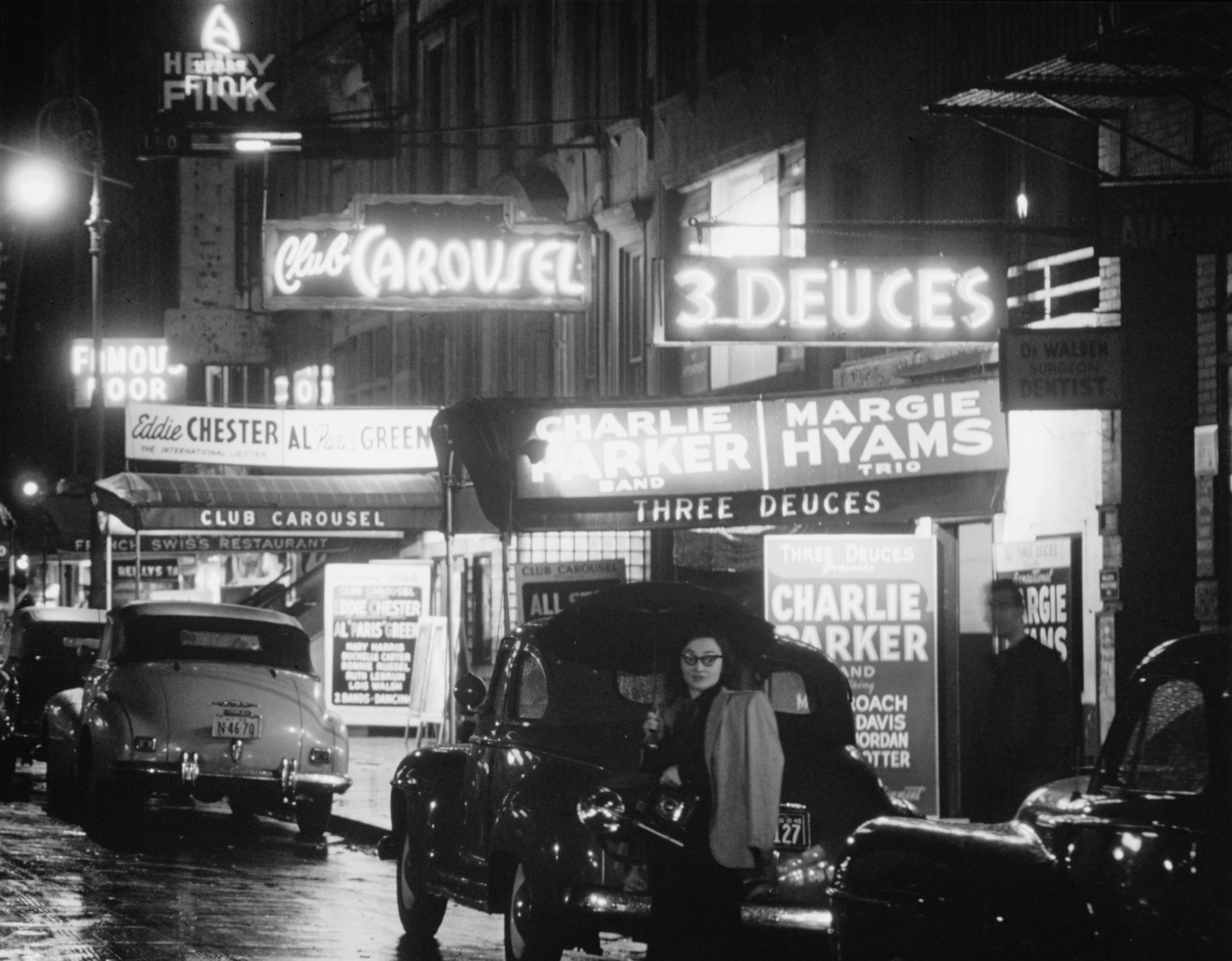
The south side of 52nd Street, between 5th & 6th Avenues – looking east from 6th Avenue (c. March 1948); photo by William P. Gottlieb

52nd Street

- Famous Door
- Jazz Standard
- Jimmy Ryan's
- Kelly's Stables
- Onyx Club

Bowery

- Five Spot

Columbus Circle

East Village

- 8BC
- Nublu Club

Greenwich Village

- Arthur's Tavern
- Blue Note
- Boomer's
- The Bottom Line
- Café Bohemia
- Café Society
- Condon's
- Nick's
- Smalls Jazz Club
- The Stone
- Village Gate
- Village Vanguard

Harlem

- Alhambra
- Apollo Theater, generally prior to the 1960s
- Cotton Club
- Lenox Lounge
- Lincoln Theater
- Minton's Playhouse
- Clark Monroe's Uptown House
- Savoy Ballroom
- Smalls Paradise
- Patrick's Place

Lower East Side

- Slugs' Saloon

Midtown Manhattan

- Birdland
- Carnegie Hall
- Iridium Jazz Club
- Roseland Ballroom

Upper West Side

- Mikell's
- Smoke

==== Queens ====
- Louis Armstrong House Museum

== Oregon ==
- Blue Monk, Portland
- Brasserie Montmartre, Portland
- Jack London Revue, Portland
- Jazz de Opus, Portland
- Jimmy Mak's, Portland

== Pennsylvania ==
=== Philadelphia ===
- Pearl Theatre
- Zanzibar Blue

=== Pittsburgh ===
- Gullifty's, Squirrel Hill
- MCG Jazz

== Texas ==
- Caravan of Dreams, Fort Worth

== Virginia ==
- The Birchmere, Alexandria

== Washington ==
- The Triple Door, Seattle
- Tula's Restaurant and Jazz Club, Seattle

== See also ==
- Jazz club
- List of jazz festivals
- List of concert halls
- List of contemporary amphitheatres
- List of opera houses
