= Music of Washington, D.C. =

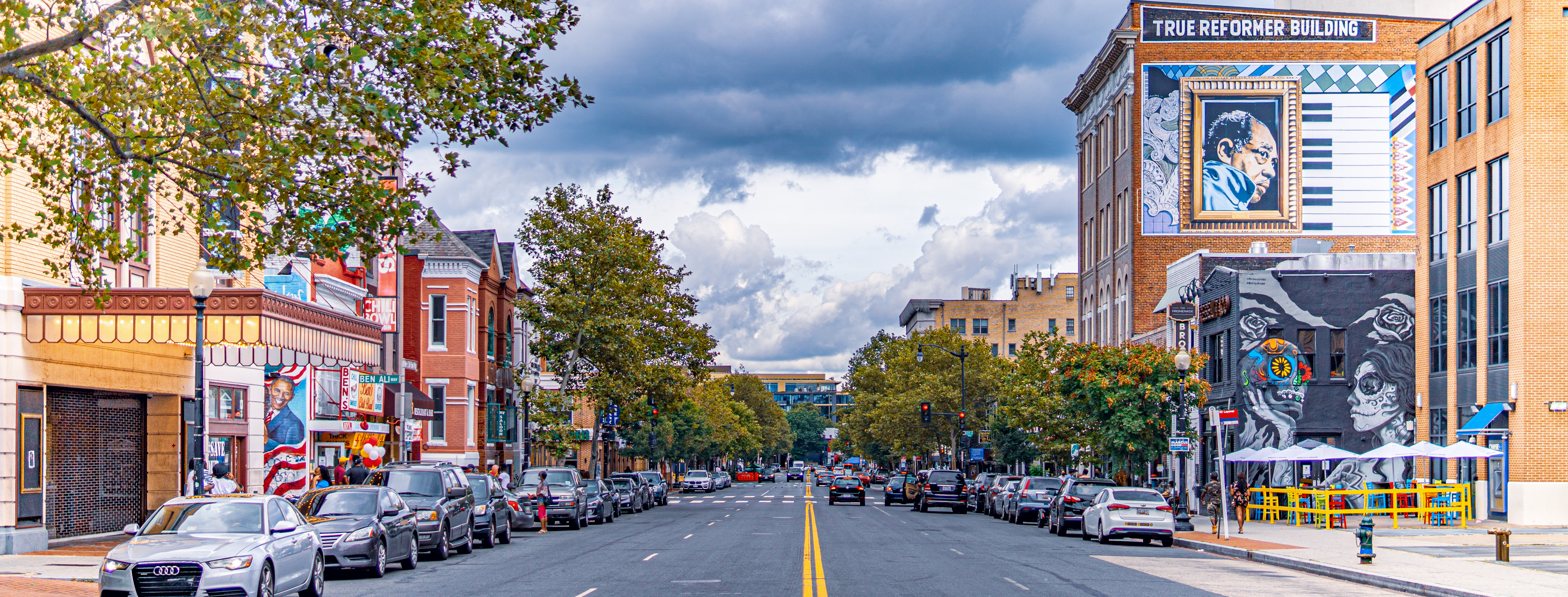
The U Street Corridor was the location of many jazz clubs and theatres during the early years of the Jazz Age.

Washington, D.C., has been home to many prominent musicians and is particularly known for the musical genres of Jazz, Rhythm & Blues, bluegrass, punk rock and its locally-developed descendants hardcore and emo, and a local funk genre called go-go. The first major musical figure from District of Columbia was John Philip Sousa, a military brass band composer. Later figures include jazz musicians, such as Duke Ellington, Charlie Rouse, Buck Hill, Ron Holloway, Davey Yarborough, Michael A. Thomas, Butch Warren, and DeAndrey Howard; soul musicians, including Billy Stewart, The Unifics, The Moments, Ray, Goodman & Brown, Van McCoy, The Presidents, The Choice Four, Vernon Burch, guitarist Charles Pitts (OST "Shaft", 1971), and Sir Joe Quarterman & Free Soul.

== Overview ==
The District is home to the Washington Symphony Orchestra, the Washington National Opera, the National Symphony Orchestra (founded in 1931 by Hans Kindler), the DC Legendary Musicians Inc. a nonprofit founded by Rev. Dr. Sandra Butler Truesdale (founded in 2002) www.dclmusicians.org and the DC Youth Orchestra Program (founded in 1960). The John F. Kennedy Center for the Performing Arts is a nationally important venue for a variety of musical performances, many of which are presented by Washington Performing Arts Society, an independent, non-profit organization founded by impresario Patrick Hayes. Washingtonian magazine maintains a Washington Music Hall of Fame.

The United States Marine Band, and United States Navy Band are both based in Washington, D.C. The Marine Band is the oldest musical group in the United States (formed in 1798, before the District's founding). The U.S. Marine Band's most famous conductor is John Philip Sousa, who composed many of the most famous American marches, as well as several musical comedies. The U.S. Navy Band's director throughout the 1960s was LCDR Anthony A. Mitchell who composed the march "Our Nation's Capital", the official march of Washington, D.C., as well as the "John F. Kennedy Cultural Center March", and the "National Capitol Parks March".

== Music history ==
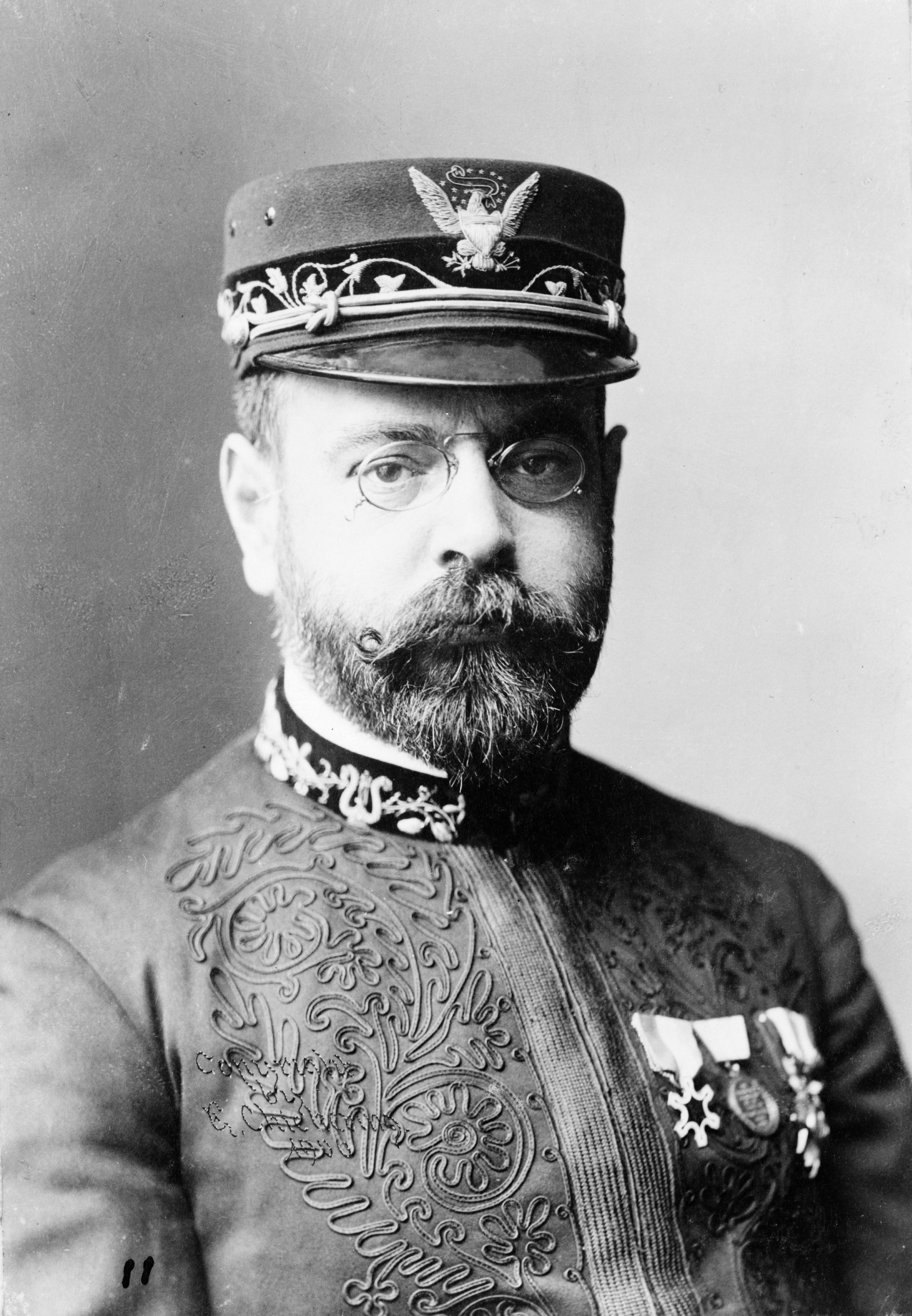
John Philip Sousa (1900)

The U.S. Marine Band was founded in 1798. Some fifty years later, in 1851, the District's first choral society, the Washington Saengerbund, was formed. Other 19th century musicians included the minstrel singer and songwriter James Bland ("Carry Me Back to Old Virginny"). In 1872, the Coloured American Opera Society formed.

Washington native John Philip Sousa was conductor of the U.S. Marine Band from 1880 to 1892. He wrote 132 marches, including "The Washington Post" and "The Stars and Stripes Forever". Sousa formed his own band after leaving the Marine Corps that performed 15,623 concerts worldwide.

Later groundbreaking musicians included James Reese Europe, ragtime musician Claude Hopkins, Lithuanian immigrant and vaudeville performer Al Jolson and Lillian Evanti, who became the first African-American opera singer to perform in a foreign country. The most widely renowned musician from 20th century District of Columbia is undoubtedly Duke Ellington, a jazz pioneer. Later District of Columbia jazz musicians included Charlie Rouse (saxophonist, with Thelonious Monk), Billy Hart (drummer), Ira Sullivan (tenor saxophonist) and Leo Parker (bop baritone saxophonist). Ahmet Ertegun, a Turkish-born jazz fan, came to District of Columbia at age twelve and later went on to found Atlantic Records. Todd Duncan was a District of Columbia-born singer who made history by being the first to play the lead of the opera Porgy and Bess; he later became the first black man to play Tonio in Pagliacci. District of Columbia was also a home (and recording stop) for Jelly Roll Morton, Jimmie Rodgers and Bo Diddley. Local stars of the early part of the century include the singer Pearl Bailey.

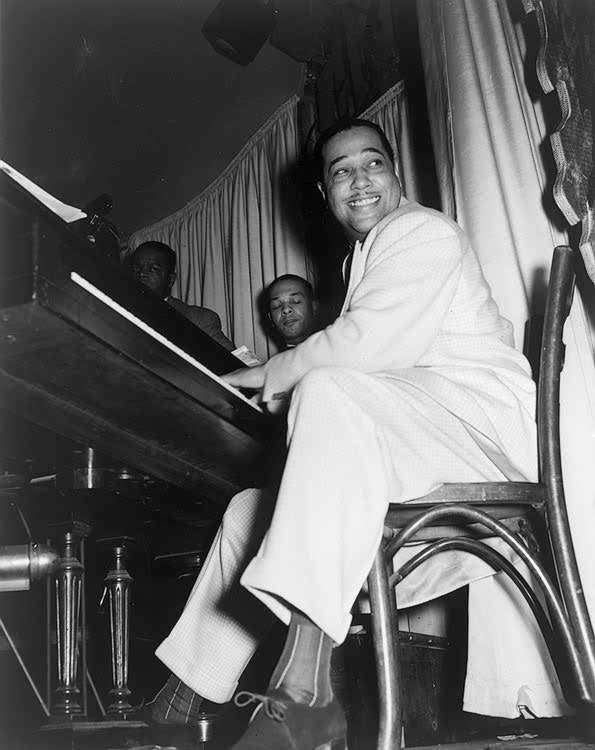
Duke Ellington was among jazz music's biggest stars.

In 1957, Elizabeth Cotten recorded for the family that employed her, which included a number of composers and musicologists. One song, "Freight Train", became a folk music standard. Charlie Byrd, a District of Columbia-based jazz musician, recorded an innovative album in 1962 called Jazz Samba with Stan Getz, helping to launch the bossa nova craze. Skip Pitts played the famous riffs on Isaac Hayes's OST "Shaft", R&B singer Ruth Brown, Billy Stewart, doo-wop groups The Orioles (based out of District of Columbia, though from Baltimore), The Clovers, The Rainbows, By the middle of the 1960s, District of Columbia had begun to produce some major stars, like soul singer Marvin Gaye, who had 3 No. 1 Hot 100 hits including "I Heard It Through the Grapevine" in 1968. Other soul musicians are Herb Fame (of Peaches & Herb) who had the No. 1 Hot 100 hit "Reunited", and Van McCoy (disco producer, No. 1 hit "The Hustle"). Other musicians included famous folk singer Scott McKenzie (known for big hit "San Francisco"), John Fahey, one of the first "folk" musicians to gain national appeal, Peter Tork (of The Monkees), Tim Buckley, guitarist Link Wray (who recorded "Rumble" in Washington), country singer Patsy Cline, guitarists Gregory Gaskins played with Jersey Cities Manhattan's and later Elvis Presley Danny Gatton, country star Roy Clark and Nils Lofgren (guitarist for Bruce Springsteen, Ringo Starr, and Neil Young). Jorma Kaukonen and Jack Casady, childhood friends from the District, moved to San Francisco, playing in Jefferson Airplane during their height of their success before forming Hot Tuna.

During this period, Washington began to develop its own music scene, with a number of styles evolving by the end of the century. Some popular singers from later decades include AC singer Roberta Flack (#1 hit "Killing Me Softly with His Song"), Root Boy Slim & the Sex Change Band ("You Broke My Mood Ring"), singer-songwriter Tori Amos, Toni Braxton, Ginuwine, Mýa, Dave Grohl (of Nirvana and the Foo Fighters), Vertical Horizon (#1 Hot 100 hit "Everything You Want" in 2000; Matt Scannell attended Georgetown University), Starland Vocal Band (#1 Hot 100 hit "Afternoon Delight"), Joan Jett (rock singer with No. 1 hit "I Love Rock 'n' Roll").

Washington is also home to the Duke Ellington School of the Arts, founded in 1974 and part of the DC public school system. Some other notable music education organizations which are located in Washington include the DC Youth Orchestra Program, founded in 1960; the Blues Alley Jazz Society, founded in 1985; Levine School of Music, founded in 1976, and the DC Legendary Musicians Inc, founded by Rev. Dr. Sandra Butler-Truesdale in 2006.

== Musical genres ==
=== Choral ===
The Washington metropolitan area is considered by many to be the choral capital of the nation. Some choral groups active in the District today can trace their origins as far back as 1851, with a Choral Society being established to produce concerts and oratorios at least as early as the 1880s. In the modern era, the District features several independently-established symphonic choruses, along with a very wide variety of mid-size choirs, chamber ensembles, and specialty groups. The District has been described as "the only locality in America where there is a chorus for every type of niche."

=== Opera ===
The first established opera company in the District of Columbia was the semi-professional Washington National Opera active from 1919 through 1936; it performed in venues ranging from local school auditoriums to DAR Constitution Hall. The present, entirely unrelated company of the same name, resident at the Kennedy Center, was known simply as the Washington Opera until 2000; a thoroughly professional organization under the direction of Plácido Domingo, it has, among other achievements, been a rare advocate for zarzuela in the United States. Among other, smaller-scale companies in the District of Columbia metropolitan area are the Washington Concert Opera, which specializes in unstaged presentations; Opera Lafayette, which specializes in French baroque opera; and Aurora Opera Theatre, formerly known as Opera Theatre of Northern Virginia.

=== Blues ===
Early in the 20th century, the District of Columbia was home to many bluesmen, such as Jelly Roll Morton and later rock and roll and rhythm and blues musicians such as Bo Diddley and Roy Buchanan. In the 1960s, a number of white youths formed local blues bands, including the Northside Blues Band and the Nighthawks. Starting in the early 1960s, Takoma Park native John Fahey became a nationally noted blues and folk guitarist who established the Takoma Records label, which attracted a number of other blues, folk, acoustic and fingerstyle guitarists to the District of Columbia area. Another local blues rock performer is Tom Principato.

=== Bluegrass ===
In the 1950s, Buzz Busby and the Bayou Boys became a noted bluegrass band that helped District of Columbia become known as the "Bluegrass Capital of America" in the 1950s and early 1960s. Later bluegrass bands from the District included the Country Gentlemen. Seldom Scene eventually became the District's most prominent and longest-lasting bluegrass band. The Washington bluegrass community extends into outlying areas such as Western Maryland and the panhandle of West Virginia which are home to bluegrass musicians who commute to perform in the area. There has been substantial overlap between Washington, D.C.'s folk and bluegrass scene in the past several decades, in part due to the patronage of disc jockeys at public radio station WAMU, including Mary Cliff, longtime host of the music show Traditions.

=== Folk ===
Folk clubs began springing up in the District of Columbia in the late 1950s. One of the earliest folk venues was at the Hamilton Arms Coffee House, which was founded in 1939 in Georgetown at 1232 31st Street NW. By the mid-1950s, Hamilton Arms was hosting "poetry readings, live music performances, art shows, movies, green tea (marijuana), and sometimes even coffee." After closing in 1957, other venues began to appear, including Coffee N' Confusion located briefly at 912 New Hampshire Avenue NW before moving to a basement location at 945 K Street NW. It has been noted that rock musician Jim Morrison, who lived in Northern Virginia up until 1961, performed his first poems at Coffee N' Confusion.

In January 1961, the Unicorn Cafe Expresso was opened at 1710 17th Street NW, featuring abstract art, coffee, poetry readings, and music. Founded by Yuri Kapralof and Roger Kaufman, the Unicorn became an important venue for up and coming folk musicians, especially after Kaufman and Kapralof sold the Unicorn to Elliott Ryan. With Hootenannys on Wednesday evening and more live performances, the Unicorn established its reputation as a music venue, where the likes of touring musicians Joan Baez, Erik Darling, and Pete LaFarge often performed along with local guitarists like John Fahey, Robbie Basho, Pat Sullivan and Max Ochs.

Another important folk venue in Georgetown in 1961 was The Shadows. A band called "the Mugwumps" formed, eventually splitting up. Two of the members, John Sebastian and Zal Yanovsky, became The Lovin' Spoonful, and the other two, Denny Doherty and Cass Elliott, formed The Mamas & the Papas. Later, in Georgetown, then-folk singer John Denver, Taffy Nivert and Bill Danoff wrote a song called "Take Me Home, Country Roads", which launched Denver's career as one of the most popular singers in the country. Other popular folk singers include Mary Chapin Carpenter; the duo Cathy Fink & Marcy Marxer have been nominated for several Grammy Awards, for both folk and children's music.

The Cellar Door at the foot of Key Bridge, was a stop for many touring folk and rock stars from the mid-1960s into the '70s.

=== Jazz ===
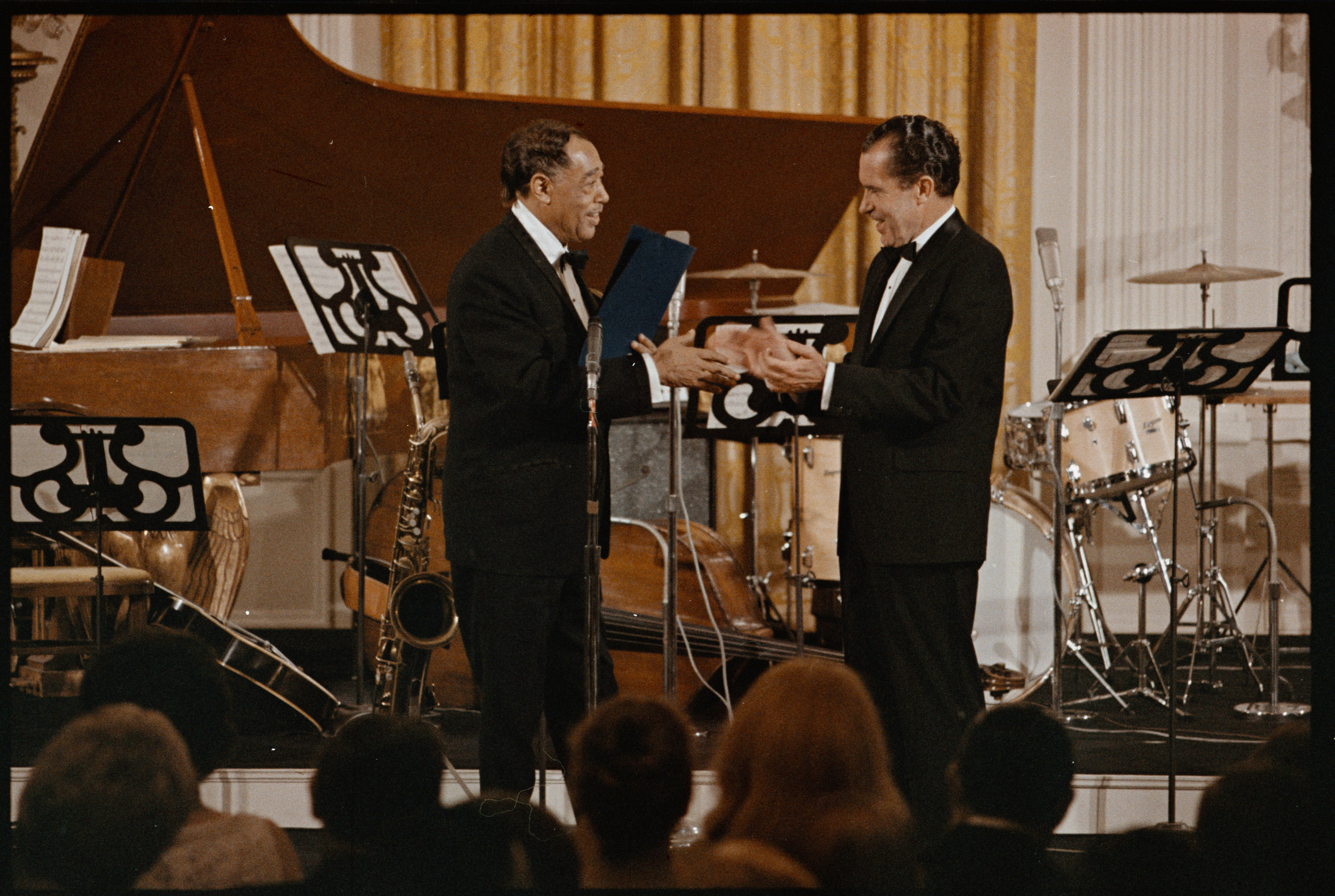
Duke Ellington, shown here receiving the Presidential Medal of Freedom from Richard Nixon at the White House in 1969, is among Washington's most important musical pioneers.

The District of Columbia has been home to many jazz pioneers, including the legendary Duke Ellington, as well as singer and pianist Shirley Horn, pianist Billy Taylor, and saxophonist Frank Wess. Ellington, Taylor, and Wess each attended Dunbar High School with its prominent music program. Ellington's first group, The Washingtonians, featured drummer Sonny Greer. They left for Harlem in 1923. Jazz great Jelly Roll Morton came from New Orleans, but took up residency in Washington as a regular performer at a club called the Jungle Inn in 1935.

During the first half of the 20th century, in a segregated District, the U Street Corridor became the economic, cultural, entertainment and jazz hub of the District of Columbia, earning it the nickname "Black Broadway". The National Trust for Historic Preservation defines walking tours that include the jazz venues where the greats such as Ella Fitzgerald performed, Duke Ellington's childhood homes, and other music-related places in the neighborhood. Historic jazz club Bohemian Caverns launched many music careers, including that of R&B singer Ruth Brown. Pianist Ramsey Lewis recorded his The in Crowd album there in 1965. The Blackbyrds, led by jazz trumpeter Donald Byrd and made up of jazz musicians from Howard University, recorded a song called "Rock Creek Park" for their album City Life in 1975 in honor of the well-known D.C landmark. During the second half of the 20th century until the mid-1990s, a period that saw decline on U Street, jazz became associated with longtime venues in the Georgetown area such as Blues Alley and One Step Down; closer to the heart of the District was dc space. Subsequently, jazz saw a resurgence on U Street, with venues such as Bohemian Caverns and Republic Gardens re-opening.

Local singer Eva Cassidy, a native of Bowie, Maryland, died of cancer at the age of 33 but received posthumous international fame when several of her songs received BBC Radio airplay, though she was already well known in the Washington area, after a farewell concert at The Bayou. A singer in multiple genres, Cassidy also notably performed a crossover album with District of Columbia go-go artist Chuck Brown (see below).

Multi-instrumentalist Andrew White has been performing and releasing records in DC since his debut record in 1961, The JFK Quintet, who released two monumental LPs on Riverside Records for Cannonball Adderley. Since then he has continued releasing albums, books, transcripts, and other publications for his self-produced label, Andrew's Music.

Tenor saxophonist Ron Holloway is a Washington, D.C., native. Ron began playing saxophone at an early age one of his first music experience was with The El Corols, where he met another great DC saxophonist, Carter Jefferson. His journeyman years sitting in with local groups from every genre of contemporary music. In the mid-1970s, Holloway expanded his practice of sitting in and more and more he was heard sharing the stage with the likes of Freddie Hubbard, Sonny Rollins and Dizzy Gillespie. In February 1982 Holloway joined Gil Scott-Heron's group. In June 1989, he left Scott-Heron to join Dizzy Gillespie's Quintet. Known for his versatility he has toured and recorded with a wide array of musical artists including Gillespie, Scott-Heron, Root Boy Slim, Little Feat, the Allman Brothers Band, Gov't Mule, Derek Trucks and Susan Tedeschi. He has released five CDs under his own name.

=== Progressive rock/psych ===
In the late 1960 and early 70s, a variety of DC groups pushed the rock envelope, forming bands and securing record deals. The Fallen Angels were one of the first national psychedelic bands from DC, releasing two records on Roulette in the late 1960s. Lead singer, writer, and musician Jack Bryant headed up a band that played up and down the east coast, as well as an occasional west coast show. Progressive metal band Animals as Leaders is from Washington, DC.

=== Soul and funk ===
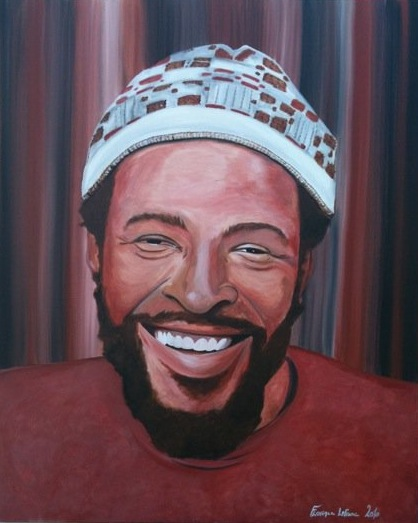
Marvin Gaye was born and raised in D.C.

The District of Columbia's Soul/Funk movement took shape during the mid-60s; about the same time Doo-Wop change to soul chorus group (The Temptations～), and "James Brown" became a big name. Parliament's 1975 song "Chocolate City," with vocals spoken by George Clinton, references and celebrates the District of Columbia as a majority black District. Artists such as Marvin Gaye, Black Heat, Experience Unlimited (E.U.), The Moments, The Unifics, Peaches & Herb, Terry Huff & Special Delivery, Act 1, The Dynamic Superiours, Sir Joe Quarterman & Free Soul, Chuck Brown & the Soul Searchers, Van McCoy, The Presidents, Anacostia, Vernon Burch, Ray, Goodman & Brown, True Reflection, The Unifics, Peaches & Herb, Act 1, The Dynamic Superiors, Skip Mahoaney & the Casuals, Dyson's Face, Bobby Thurston, Charles Pitts (OST "Shaft", 1971), The Choice Four, The Fuzz, Dane Riley, and Billy Stewart were from Washington, D.C. 1980s funk bands such as Osiris, Wax, Waldo, Tyrone Brunson influenced go-go bands. Minor group Aggression released 2 singles (roots of go-go) from SRI Records. Producer Maxx Kidd founded T.T.E.D. Records.

=== R&B ===
The soul and funk scene set the stage for District of Columbia's considerable influence in modern R&B. Besides Toni Braxton, District of Columbia is the hometown of mid-1990s crooners Ginuwine, Mýa, and Tank (raised in Clinton, MD), as well as the more current J. Holiday, Raheem DeVaughn and Reesa Renee (who are both from the neighboring Prince George's County, Maryland). Central Heat, an East Coast touring R&B band based out of Northern Virginia originated in the late 1970s and features founding members Doug and Dennis Flynn, Mike Cavaliere and Bob Costlow. Central Heat remains active in the DC club scene today. Johnny Gill, II D Extreme, and Stacy Lattisaw are also from the District of Columbia. Also, independent recording artist Dane Riley, who is the cousin of the late legendary Washington, DC singer Billy Stewart.

=== Go-go ===
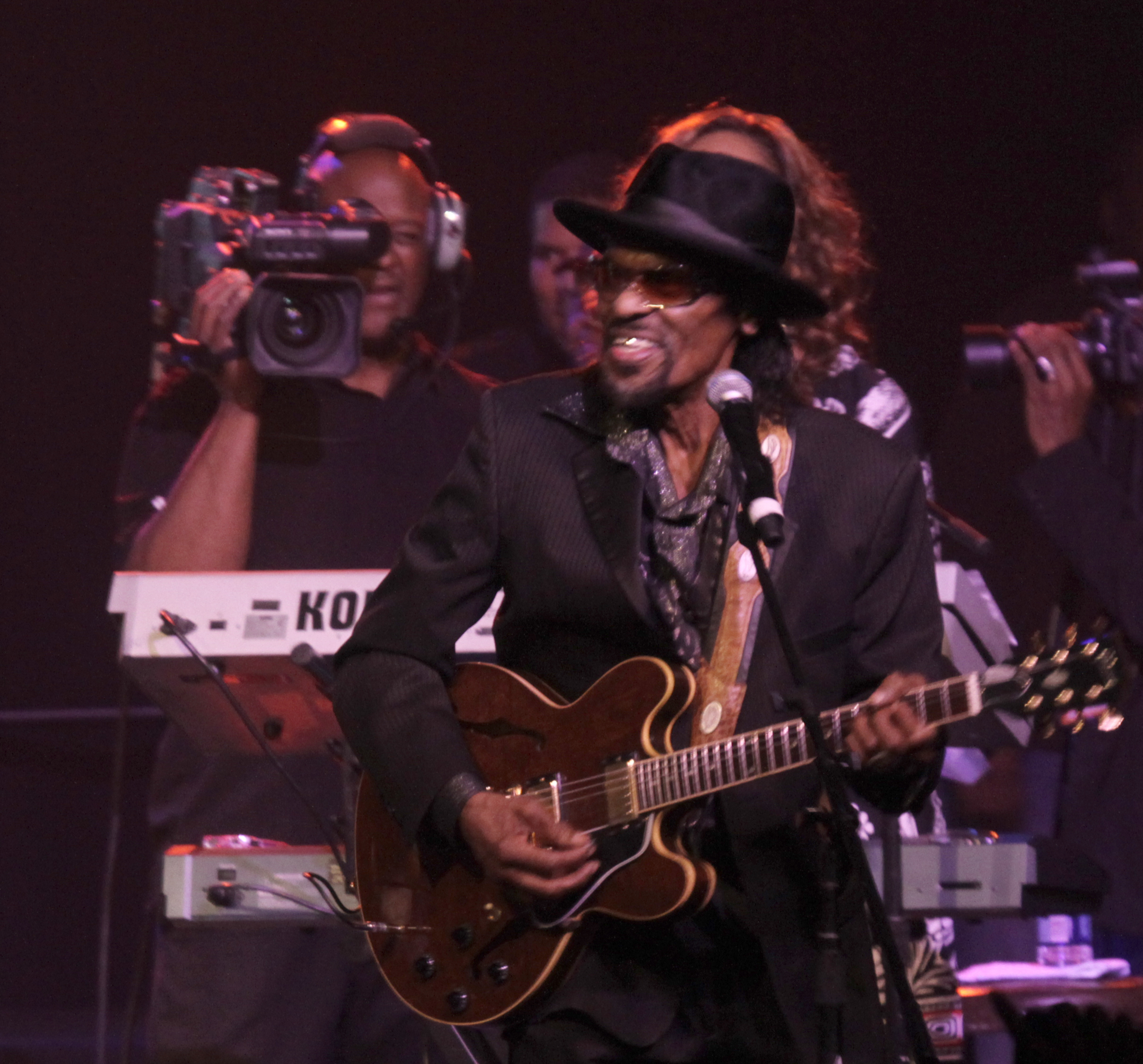
Chuck Brown was the godfather of go-go music.

Go-go music originated in Washington, D.C. during the mid-1970s and began to take its current shape by the late '70s. Its characteristic formula combined simple funk grooves with instrumental percussion and often rapping. It is a blend of funk, R&B, and latin music, with a focus on lo-fi percussion instruments and melodic jamming in place of dance tracks, although some sampling is used. As such, it is primarily a dance music with an emphasis on live audience call and response. Go-go rhythms are also incorporated into street percussion. Many "District of Columbia" soul & funk artists contributed to the characteristic go-go sound, but the main pioneers were Chuck Brown & the Soul Searchers, known for "Bustin' Loose", which became a surprise national hit. Later go-go bands include Trouble Funk, Experience Unlimited (E.U., whose hit "(Doin') Da Butt" was featured in Spike Lee's 1988 "School Daze"), Rare Essence, Hot Cold Sweat, AM/FM, The Junkyard Band, Slug-Go and the Southeast go-go band Aggressive Funk. Bands such as Backyard, TCB, and UCB have gained recognition by being featured in music by the rapper Wale.

=== Hardcore ===
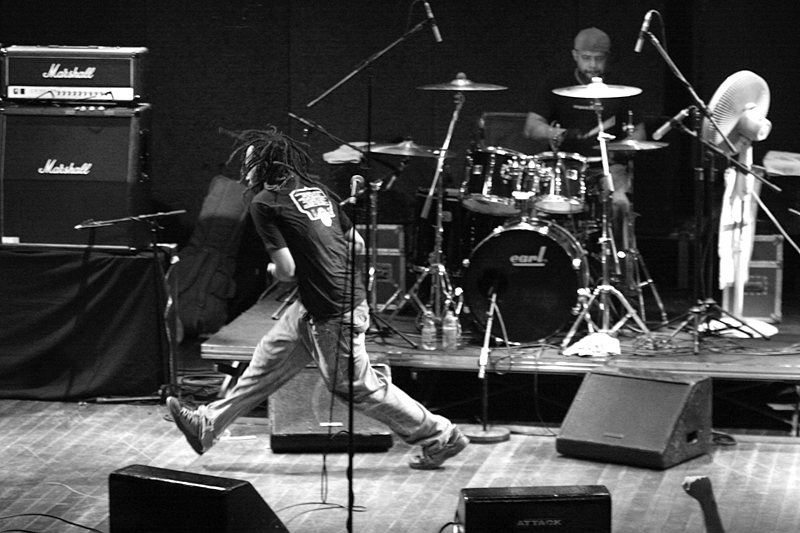
Bad Brains was one of the leading hardcore punk bands.

The District of Columbia is primarily known in the rock community for its seminal influence on the evolution of hardcore punk, known locally as harDCore, particularly through bands such as Bad Brains, Minor Threat, and The Faith, and labels like Dischord Records, but it had a vibrant musical community prior to hardcore's arrival with bands like the Razz, Slickee Boys, Insect Surfers, Tru Fax and the Insaniacs, and The Penetrators, putting out records on local independent labels like Limp, Wasp, and Dacoit. Ian MacKaye, the frontman for Minor Threat, became an inspiration in part for the international Straight Edge movement after the song "Straight Edge" was released. MacKaye went on to co-found Fugazi, which attained international recognition under the Dischord record label, alongside Rites of Spring guitarist Guy Picciotto. Henry Rollins, a native of the District of Columbia hardcore scene, moved to Los Angeles in 1981 to join Black Flag.

=== Emo ===
In the mid-1980s, veterans of the D.C. hardcore scene created a new punk subgenre called "emo", meaning "emotive hardcore." This term has since evolved to become associated with a much broader group of musical styles. The most renowned District of Columbia area bands associated with the "first wave" of emo were Rites of Spring and Embrace.

=== Punk ===
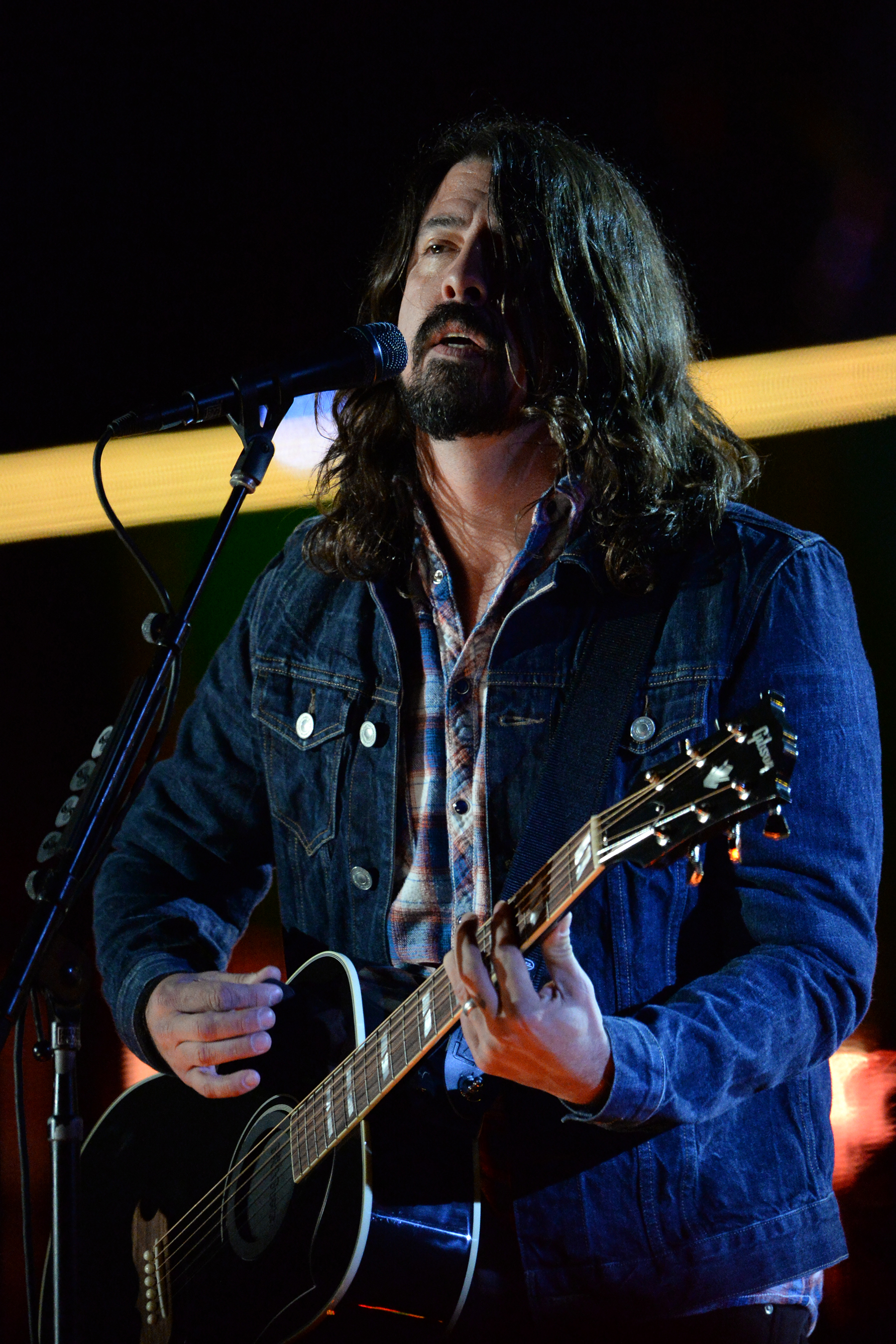
Dave Grohl, member of Nirvana and the Foo Fighters, grew up in the area and began his career playing in D.C.

In the 1980s, the District of Columbia, was rich with punk and new wave music. Bands like The Slickee Boys, Urban Verbs, Tiny Desk Unit, Mother May I, Insect Surfers, Tru Fax & the Insaniacs, and Black Market Baby were popular at places like the 9:30 Club, The Psychedeli, dc space, Madam's Organ, The Bayou (in Georgetown). See also: Bad Brains, Minor Threat, Henry Rollins. In the 1970s and 1980s, Georgetown had a diverse live music scene, and became known as a center for the early punk community. In the 1990s, U Street NW in the Shaw neighborhood became known as a new haven for post-hardcore punk, alternative rock, acid jazz and electronica, following the establishment of a variety of bars and clubs in the area, most notably The Black Cat (which was co-founded by Dave Grohl, another native of the DC punk scene). The 9:30 club subsequently moved to the area as well.

=== Post-hardcore ===
In the 1990s, bands taking heavy influence from the Washington, D.C., hardcore scene and the local go-go phenomenon contributed to the post-hardcore scene. Important players in this scene were The Dismemberment Plan, Fugazi, Nation of Ulysses, Trans Am, and Q and Not U. Currently, important post-punk/indie/dance-rock bands like Supersystem (formerly El Guapo), Medications, Metrorail, Maritime, Edie Sedgwick, Mass Movement of the Moth, The Fordists, and Beauty Pill hail from DC. Ian MacKaye continues his involvement in the DC music scene with his two-piece rock group The Evens. Record labels like Dischord, DeSoto Records, Exotic Fever, and Amor Y Lucha have been and remain to be a crucial means of distribution for DC bands.

=== Hip hop ===
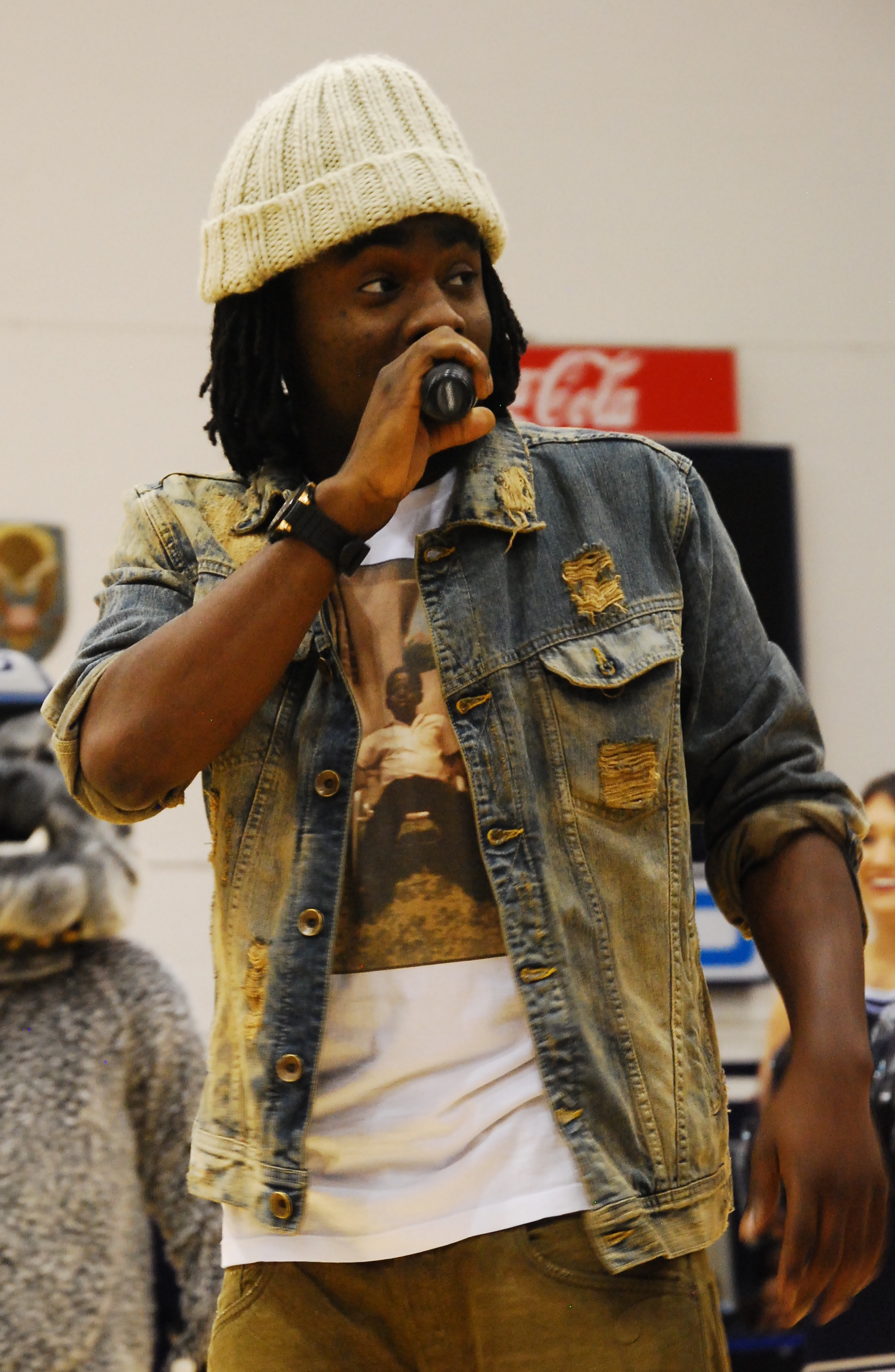
Wale is among the most notable rappers to come out of D.C.

The DC hip-hop scene has always taken a back seat to the other more prevalent genres in the area. Even so, influential groups have planted seeds in the District for future generations to follow. Groups like The Amphibians & Freestyle Union laid the foundation for artists like Asheru, Wale and Low Budget to help put DC's hip-hop scene on the map. Wale was the first District of Columbia artist to really break out on the national scene. He was a member of XXL's 2009 Freshman Class and released his debut album, Attention Deficit on Interscope Records. Representing the street-oriented side of hip-hop, District of Columbia-bred rapper Garvey "The Chosen One" released his debut album Hard Hat Area Volume#1, on independent record label Triple Team Entertainment and distributed by DTLR. When it came time to the video's shoot location for his single "Lock It Down," released 2010, he chose local high school Calvin Coolidge High School, alma mater of the video's director, Robert "Bob Smoke" Headen, did more than just provide the setting—members of the school's band, cheerleading team, step team and dance squad are all featured in the released video as noted by the Washington Post. DMV emcee Marky has been gaining national recognition for his song "Rasta Monsta," sampling Aloe Blacc's "I Need A Dollar.". Underground group Diamond District represent the vanguard as well as an underground rapper from (Fairmont Heights/P.G.County) born name Micah Paschal rap name MIKE.P also represent DC hip-hop today.

The District of Columbia's hip-hop scene was notably featured in the 1998 film Slam, about a would-be slam poet's ordeal in the District of Columbia Jail. Pharaoh Jonez, an Emcee from Southeast DC is one of the most successful rapper/producers from the DMV's underground scene. In 2010 he managed to get his music into the hands of an A&R over at Slip-n-Slide Records which did nothing for his career until 2012 when he landed a spread in Kapital Magazine alongside Kendrick Lamar, Drumma Boy, and fellow DC rapper Wale, who of which Jonez has never met before. In 2013 Pharaoh Jonez signed a management contract with Lawrence Mooney, CEO of Chocolate Mint and longtime friend of "Freeway" Rick Ross.

=== Electronic dance music/house ===
The District of Columbia has been home to a booming House music scene. Driven by weekly parties such as Buzz (DC), internationally recognized acts like Deep Dish, underground talent including DJ Sam “The Man” Burns, and DJ duos like East Coast Boogiemen (Ken Christensen and Juan Zapata), and Beautiful Swimmers. Venues include Echo Stage, Flash, U Street Music Hall, and Eighteenth Street Lounge. House music parties regularly take place at clubs and warehouses across the District. Past venues include Nation (nightclub) (formerly the Capital Ballroom), Red (nightclub), Club Five (Thomas Blondet was residents on Saturdays. Local and influential House music DJ Sam “The Man” Burns held a regular House club night on Sundays at Eighteenth Street Lounge up until his passing in 2020.

Another electronic-dance music subgenre that was born in the District of Columbia is Moombahton. The style of music was created by local D.J. Dave Nada (member of the duo Nadastrom alongside producer Matt Nordstrom) who accidentally created a new and unique EDM sound at a party in Fall 2009, by slowing down the tempo of an Electro House song and placing a reggaeton beat on top of the house track. His invention sparked an underground EDM movement not only in the District of Columbia but also worldwide, all through the early 2010s. In addition to Nadastrom, well known Moombahton producers include Munchi, Dillon Francis, and Bro Safari.

The District of Columbia is also the home to the group Thievery Corporation, who are well known in the electronic music community for their fusion of downtempo and trip hop with lounge music and Brazilian music such as bossa nova. They founded the label Eighteenth Street Lounge Music, which is also based in Washington, D.C.

Local recording artists Fort Knox Five have found success with a string of releases on their own label, Fort Knox Recordings, many notable remixes and their full-length album Radio Free DC.

Yoko K. is an electronic musician based in Washington, D.C. Her self-produced debut album 012906 (Asahra Music, 2006) was nominated for Best Album in Electronica by the 6th Annual Independent Music Awards. The first single cut, "searching", was acclaimed by Adam Harrington (Whisperin' & Hollerin', UK) to be "truly the work of a visionary" and received Grand Prize in the Electronic Jazz category by the Artists Forum Electronic Music Competition (2006). She was an Artist in Residence at the Strathmore in North Bethesda, Maryland in 2011.

The District of Columbia, is also the home of multi-instrumentalist, producer, and synthesist Jeff Bragg, whose work spans over four decades, beginning with his residency as director of the University of Virginia's electronic music studio in the mid-1970s.

Anaud Strong is a premier dance-house, soul, R&B-funk, gospel international recording artist, remixer, singer-songwriter, producer and digital dj, born and raised in the District of Columbia and Maryland. Strong has been influential in the continuation and the pioneering of the early garage house, electronic dance music, underground dance, and art scene since the 90s to the present through various districtwide events and philanthropic efforts within the related community. The dance music collective and EP Anaud Strong Project Into The Future...The Deep House Experience RECHARGED! was nominated in the 24th Annual Wammies 2009–2010 in 4 categories for best Electronica Vocalist, Performance Artist, Electronica Artist/Producer (STUDIO), and electronica recording for "Into The Future".

Electro-industrial band Chemlab formed in the District of Columbia, in 1989. Up until this point, frontman Jared Louche had been a part of the District of Columbia hardcore scene (see below).

Artists from District of Columbia area's premiere dark electronic label Octofoil Records, to include Maduro, Retrogramme, and Notecrusher, have appeared on numerous compilations around the world and have been featured on BBC. Octofoil has been defunct since 2014.

=== A cappella ===
The District of Columbia has a very vibrant a cappella scene. Sweet Honey in the Rock, which formed in 1973 and focuses on music rooted in African American culture, has shared a Grammy Award and received multiple Grammy nominations for its children's albums. Afro Blue, an a cappella vocal jazz ensemble based at Howard University, received significant national attention when it placed fourth on season three of the television show The Sing Off in 2011. There are several ″vocal bands″ in the area, while ensembles like The Capital Hearings bridge the lines between the choral tradition, vocal jazz, and contemporary a cappella.

=== Mod and soul ===
The Ambitions, led by former Checkered Cabs singer Caz Gardiner, are at the forefront of the mod/soul type bands drawing their inspiration from late 60s soul bands to 1970s British mod revivalists.

=== Garage revival ===
In recent years, DC has become home to a growing scene of musicians, drawing inspiration from the 1960s garage rock movement. Eschewing the more esoteric stylings of their art-school peers, bands like Soul Lip, the Hall Monitors, the breakUps, the Have Mercys, the Points, Shark Week, The Fed, and Fellowcraft have sprung up across the city.

== The Wammies ==
The Washington Area Music Awards, also known as the Wammies, was founded in 1985 by Michael Jaworek and Mike Schreibman and has been committed to raising the profile of the Washington area's diverse music community.

In 2019, The MusicianShip undertook the task of preserving the Wammie Awards. In an effort to celebrate honour and uplift creative heroes across the DMV area. The 2020 Virtual Wammies were hosted between July 13th to July 17th and honoured winners across 57 musical and general interest categories.

== Performance venues ==
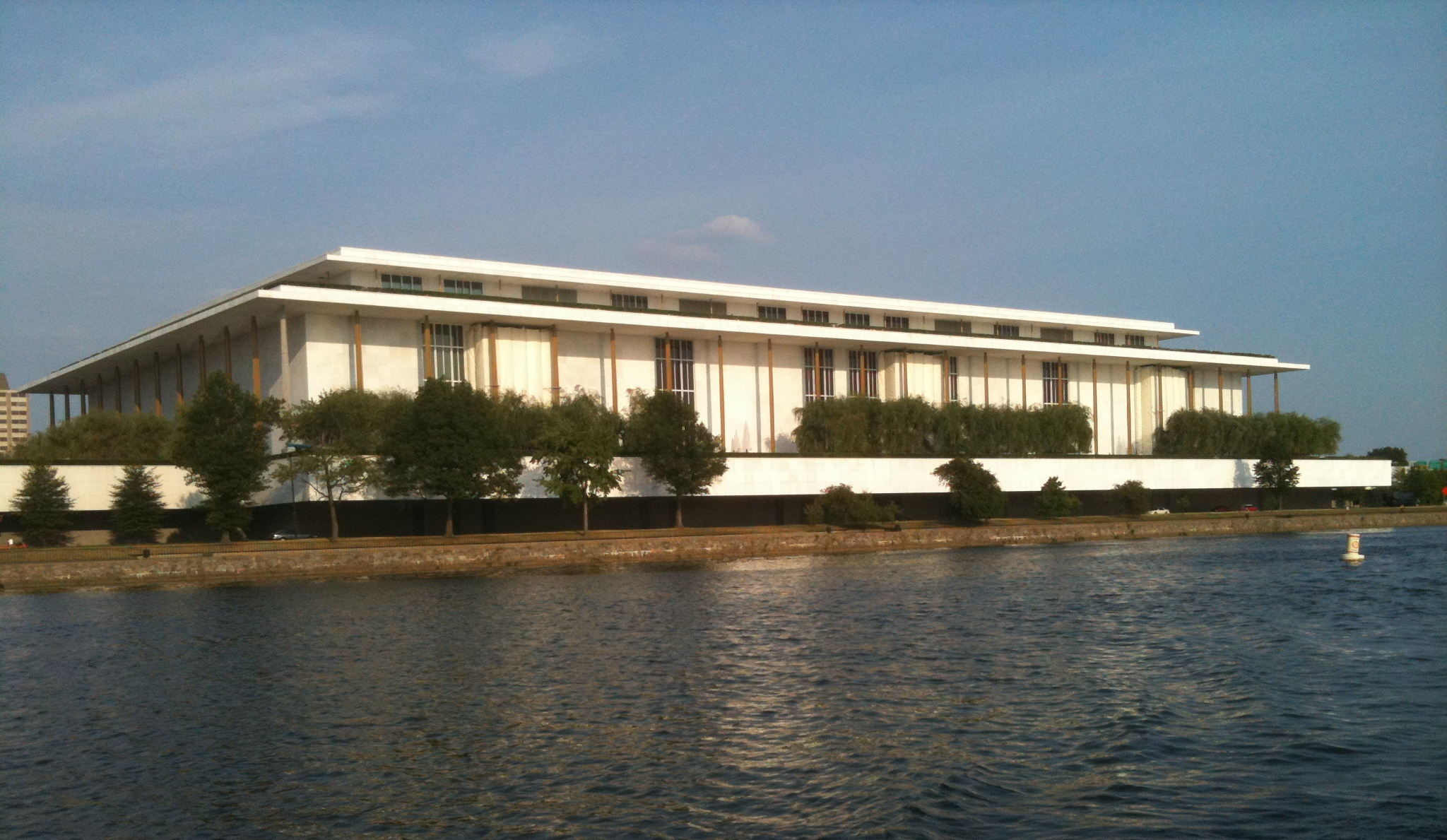
Kennedy Center for the Performing Arts

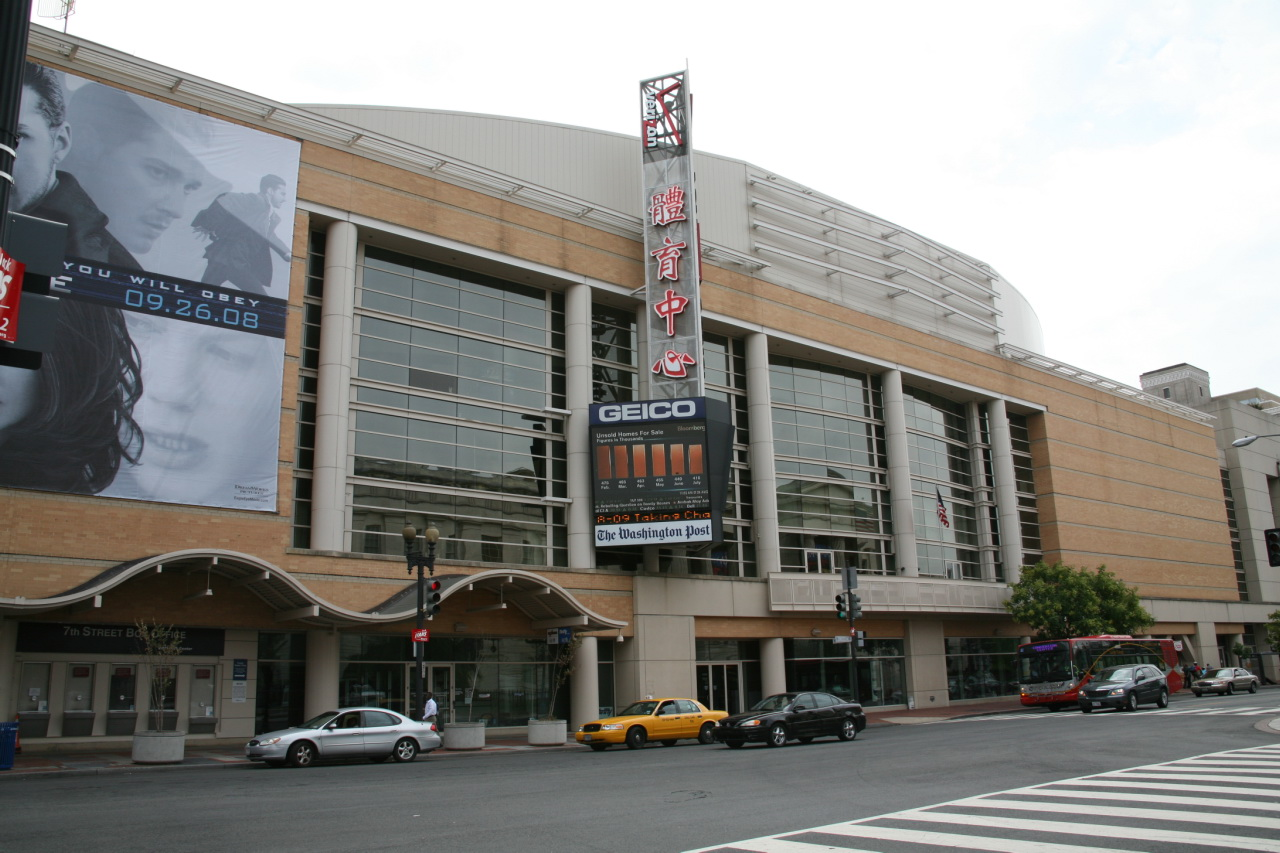
Capital One Arena

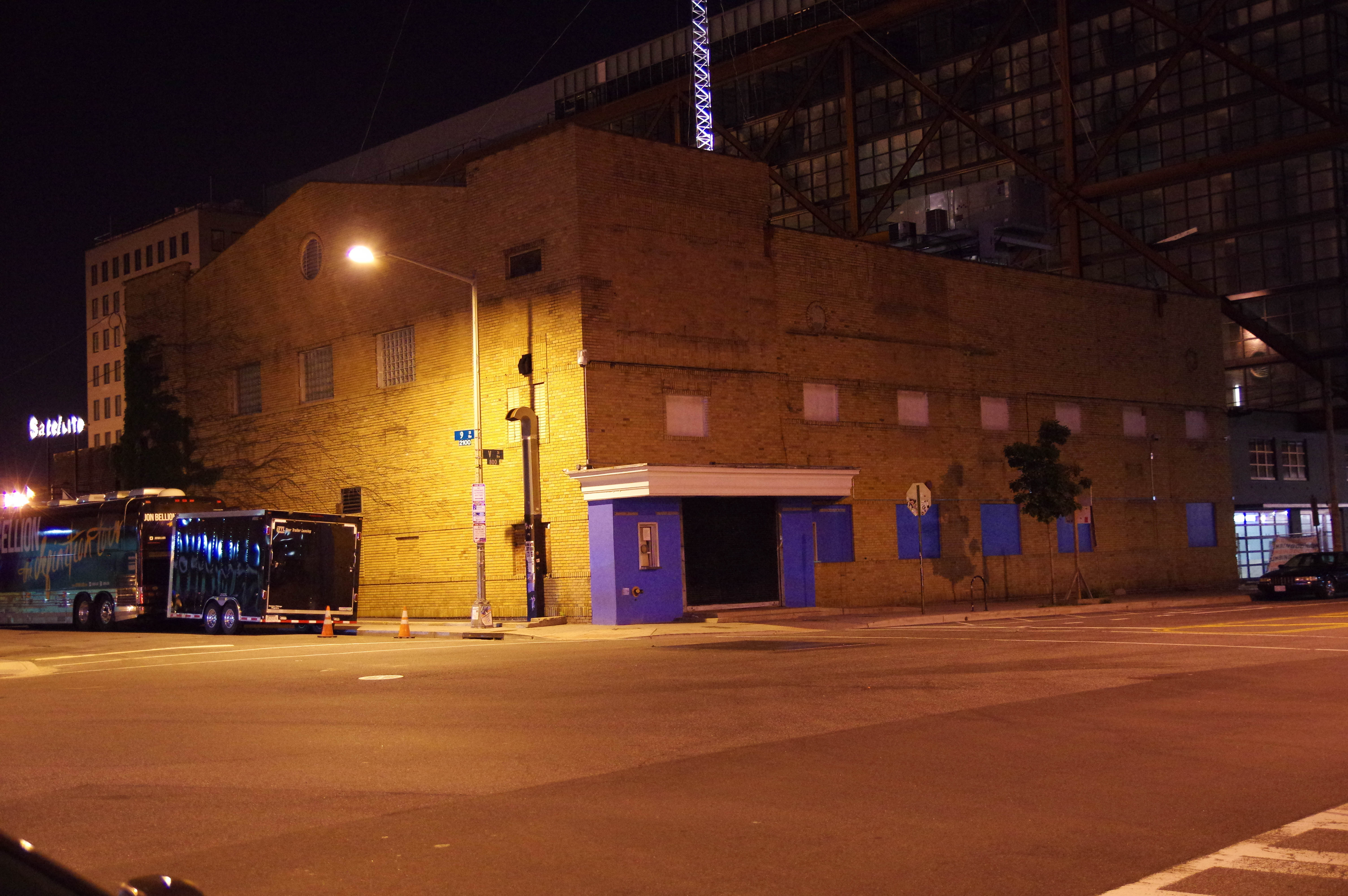
The 9:30 Club is considered by many to be one of the best live music venues in the country.

The Washington area has many venues large and small for music performances. Capital One Arena hosts many major concerts. The Kennedy Center is home to the Washington National Opera and the National Symphony Orchestra. Wolf Trap National Park for the Performing Arts in Vienna, Virginia hosts many performances and the Wolf Trap Opera Company. The Merriweather Post Pavilion in Columbia, Maryland and Nissan Pavilion in Bristow, Virginia also host many national touring musical acts.

Notable licensed venues in the District of Columbia include and have included:

- Act IV (venue) (DC Nightclub) Upper Wisconsin Ave, Georgetown Classic Rock
- The Anthem (from 2017) – The Wharf
- The Atlantis (from 2023) - U Street
- Asylum (1991-2011) – Adams Morgan / U Street – alternative rock, electronic
- The Atlas Performing Arts Center – H Street – musical theater, light opera
- The Bayou (1953–1998) – Georgetown – classic rock, metal
- Beneath It All – Georgetown, under the Crazyhorse, small venue with acoustic and softer rock
- Black Cat (From 1993) – U Street – alternative rock, international, various, post-hardcore
- Blues Alley (From 1965) – Georgetown – jazz, blues
- Bohemian Caverns (1926–1968) (From 1990s) – U Street – jazz, blues
- The Cave, (DC Nightclub) Behind My Mother's Place in the alley, 18th St
- Cafe Lautrec/Toulouse-Lautrec Mural / Cafe Toulouse (1980s-c.2004) – Adams Morgan – jazz, bossa nova
- The Cellar Door (1960s–1980s) – Georgetown – folk, classic rock, blues rock
- DAR Constitution Hall (From 1929) – Foggy Bottom – large concert hall
- Corpse Fortress (1986–2011) – various genres
- The Crazy Horse (DC Nightclub) M St, Georgetown Classic Rock
- DC9 (From 2004) – U Street – various genres, mid-size venue
- dc space (1980s) – initials meant to stand for "District Creative" as well as its locale, a small club primarily devoted to punk rock and free jazz concerts
- Electric Maid (From 2001) – Takoma – folk, post-hardcore, various genres
- Black Cat, Washington, D.C., nightclub, Food for Thought (1973–2000), folk, various genres
- Fort Reno Park (From 1967) – Upper Northwest, various genres, go-go, post-hardcore (outdoor)
- Fran O'brien's, Across the alley from the Cave, which was behind My Mother's Place, 18th & M, NW.
- The Hamilton Live, (Since 2011, DC Music Venue) 600 14th St NW (block from The White House)
- The Keg, (DC Nightclub) Upper Wisconsin Ave, about 1/2 block from "Good Guys" Georgetown Classic Rock
- Lincoln Theatre (1922–1968, reopened 1994) – U Street – concert hall
- Madam's Organ (From 1992) – Adams Morgan – various genres, blues, swing
- My Mother's Place, (DC Nightclub) 18th & M St NW Classic Rock
- Nation / The Capital Ballroom - (1995-2006) - 1015 Half Street SE - electronic music
- New Mac's, (DC Nightclub), M St, Georgetown, across 34th St from Cellar Door, Classic Rock, The Mugwumps, later called The Mamas & the Papas, started here.
- 9:30 Club (1980–present) – originally at 930 F St. NW, since 1996 at U Street Corridor, alternative rock, major venue
- One Step Down (1960s–2000) – Foggy Bottom – jazz, blues
- Pearl Street Warehouse - Since October 2017, The Wharf
- The Paul Mall, (DC Nightclub) Couple doors down from the Crazy Horse, frequented by the "Washington Redskins"
- The Rabbits Foot, (DC Nightclub) Upper Wisconsin Ave, just above Georgetown
- The Red & the Black (From 2006) – H Street – rock, hardcore
- Red (nightclub)
- Republic Gardens (1920s–1960s, reopened 1996) (1996–2007) – U Street – jazz, blues, dance hall
- Rock N Roll Hotel (From 2006) – H Street – rock, various genres
- Show Bar and the Palace of Wonders (From 2006) – H Street – various genres, burlesque
- Songbyrd Music House, (Washington, D.C., nightclub) (2015–present) [Adams Morgan] – various genres, mid-size venue
- State of the Union (1991-c.2001) – U Street – alternative rock, electronic dance
- "New" Vegas Lounge (From 1950s) – Logan Circle – motown, blues, R&B
- Velvet Lounge – U Street – punk rock, electronic, various genres
- Warehouse Next Door (1998–2009, merged with theater) – Downtown – various genres
- Warner Theatre (multiuse 1924–1989, concert venue from 1989) – Downtown – large concert hall
- The Wax Museum (1981-1984) 4th and E st. SW, Washington, DC, National Acts, Stevie Ray Vaughan, Three Dog Night etc. open 1982 – 1984.
- The Corpse Fortress – A Co-Op house Venue formally in the Silver Spring Area, since shut down due to structural concerns, an iconic spot for 2000's Punk and Hardcore bands
- The Metro Cafe – Live Music Venue – Late 1990 – 2001 at 1522 14th St. NW, Washington, DC 20005
