= Haig Club =

Haig Club may refer to:

- Haig (whisky)
- The Haig, a jazz club in Los Angeles
