= Quality Cafe =

Quality Cafe is the name of two different former locations in Downtown Los Angeles, California.

- Quality Cafe (diner), a now-defunct diner at 1236 West 7th Street
- Quality Cafe (jazz club), a historical restaurant and jazz club located at 1143 East 12th Street near Central Avenue
