= 500-series format =

Signal processing format

The 500-series format is a standardized format for a modular signal processor system consisting of a combination of 500-series modules installed within a 500-series chassis (or rack), with the chassis providing power and audio connections for the individual modules. Originally invented by Automated Processes, Inc. co-founder Saul Walker, today numerous companies manufacture 500-series format products.

The modular nature of the 500-series format allows individual modules to be combined to create a customized signal processing chain, with individual modules added or changed as budget allows. Many 500-series chassis also offer portability, allowing a recording engineer to bring their desired signal processing chain to any recording session.

== History ==
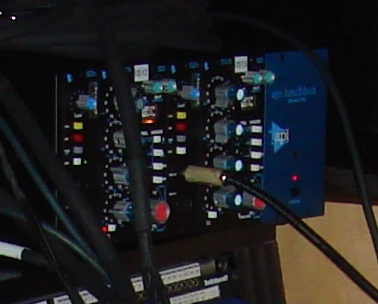
500-6B 500-series Lunchbox System with 512C Mic/Line Preamp (×2), 550B 4-band EQ (×2), and 525 Compressor (×2)

In 1967, Lou Lindauer and Saul Walker designed a mixing console for Apostolic Recording Studio, the first 12-track recording studio in New York City. The console's modular design, invented by Walker, became the 500-series format, and Walker and Lindauer co-founded Automated Processes, Inc. (API) in 1969.

API's 500-series modules include the 512C preamplifier, the 525 compressor, the 527 compressor, the 550A and 550B semi-parametric equalizers, and the 560 graphic equalizer.

In the mid-1970s, some recording engineers began removing individual processor modules from API mixing consoles and installing them into homemade mounting systems. In 1978, Datatronix licensed the rights to API from the owners and manufactured a 10-slot 500-series chassis.

In 1985, the assets of API were purchased by Paul Wolff. In response to increasing demand, Wolff introduced the API Lunchbox, a portable chassis for housing 500-series modules in 2-slot, 6-slot, and 10-slot configurations. Later, API would establish ownership of the Lunchbox trademark.

Popularity in the 500-series format surged in the mid-2000s, and by 2020, there were over five hundred different 500-series modules on the market from API and numerous third-party manufacturers, including Neve, Solid State Logic, Aphex, dbx, and others.

== VPR Alliance ==
In 2006 API established the VPR Alliance, which established 500-series specification standards to ensure compatibility with API 500-series rack systems.

VPR Alliance standards dictate voltage at +/- 16 volts, with +48 volts for phantom power, with maximum current draw of 130, 130 and 5 mA respectively per slot. Each module has three input and output pins, for +4db, -2dB and negative balanced signals. The physical dimensions are 3U vertically (5.25") and multiples of 1.5" wide, with 15-pin edge-connector pin configuration of 500-series modules.
