= Clif Payne =

American singer and songwriter

- Born: June 8, 1954 (age 72); Harlem, New York, U.S.
- Occupations: Singer; Musician
- Spouse: Susan Jandro (m. 1986; div. 2010)
- Children: Myles Payne, Emily Payne
- Musical career
- Genres: Contemporary jazz; R&B; Gospel; Soul; Musical theater
- Instruments: Vocals; Guitar
- Website: clifpayne.org

Clif Payne (born June 8, 1954) is an American singer, musician, and educator whose vocal style has generally been classified in the jazz, R&B, gospel, blues, rock, folk and pop genres. His duet, No Payne, No Gain, recorded with Freda Payne, charted at #1 on Great Britain's Soul/R&B charts in 2016. He has performed with such artists as Evelyn "Champagne" King, Norman Connors, Bobby McFerrin, Ellis Hall, Sheena Easton, and former Chicago (band) vocalist Bill Champlin among others.

== Early life ==
Payne was born in Sugar Hill, Manhattan to James and Aline (née McIntyre) Payne on June 8, 1954. His father was a jazz musician and his mother was a singer. Both of his parents were involved in the Harlem Sugar Hill jazz music scene and they resided at 935 St. Nicolas Avenue, New York where Duke Ellington lived on the floor above as well as other established jazz musicians. He and his family moved to Evansville, Indiana in 1959. In addition to singing, Payne learned to play the guitar in 1962 at age 8 and the violin at age 10. In high school he performed in musicals on vocals, guitar, violin, and violin and was also in the school orchestra and choir. He graduated from North High School in 1972 and attended the Indiana University Bloomington to study music and journalism. While in college, Payne sang in the show choir The Singing Hoosiers. He went on to study jazz with David Baker (composer) and classical composition with John Eaton.

== Music career ==
=== No Payne, No Gain ===
In 2016, Payne released his debut album, Welcome To My World which features a Clif Payne/Freda Payne duet, No Payne, No Gain. A dance mix of "No Payne, No Gain" produced by the UK's Nigel Lowis was on the 2016 Grammy ballot for nomination for Best R&B Vocal. "No Payne, No Gain," written by Preston Glass, spent two weeks at the top of the Soul/R&B charts in Great Britain, receiving the title of UK’s Soul Song of the Year. The album was produced by Preston Glass and Larry Batiste and included vocals by Maxine Jones and Reggie Calloway. In August 2016, Clif and Freda performed their duet live in LA at Herb Alpert's Vibrato Grill & Jazz club.

=== MLK tribute - Living Jazz ===
Payne is an annual performer and contributor at the Annual Musical Tribute Honoring Dr. Martin Luther King, Jr. in Oakland, California, which develops and oversees music education and performance programs for children.

=== Vocal instructor ===
Payne is a vocal instructor who has taught at the California Jazz Conservatory as well as privately.
