= Automated Processes, Inc. =

American audio equipment manufacturer

- Type: Private
- Industry: Professional audio
- Founded: 1969; 57 years ago in New York City, United States
- Founders: Saul Walker, Lou Lindauer
- Headquarters: Jessup, Maryland, United States
- Key people: Larry Droppa (president)
- Products: 500 Series Modules - 550 A, 550 B, 512 C, 512 V, 312, 525, 527 A, 529; Rackmount products - 2500, 5500, The Channel Strip, 3122 V, 3124 V, 3124; MV Consoles - 1608, 2448, THE BOX Console, Legacy AXS, Vision
- Owner: Larry Droppa
- Website: www.apiaudio.com

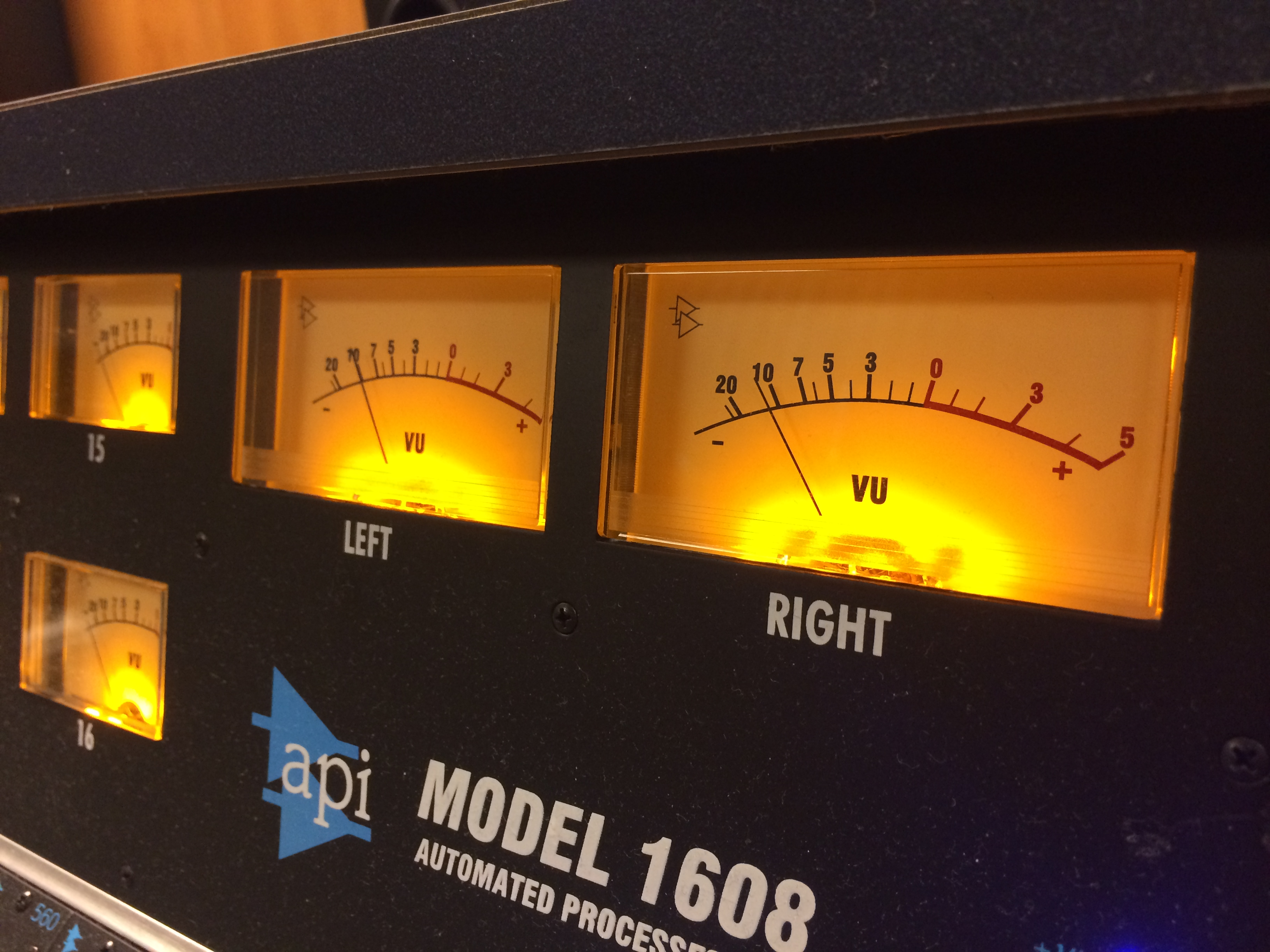

Automated Processes Inc. (API or API Audio) is an American company that designs, manufactures, and markets mixing consoles and signal processors, including modular signal processor units in the 500-series format standard that evolved from early API mixing consoles.

== History ==
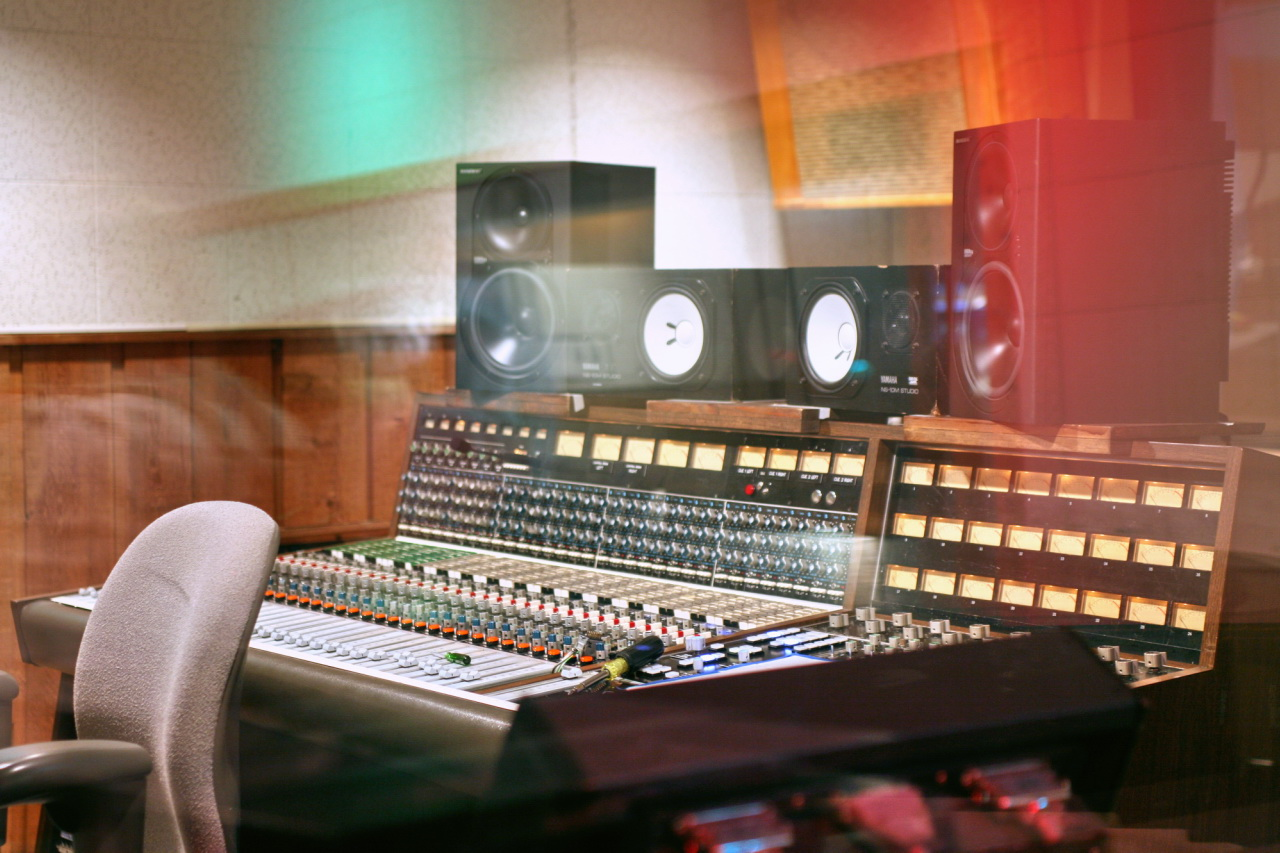
API 2098 32 x 16 x 24 console with 550A and 550 EQ at RCA Studio B. This console has since been moved to Columbia Studio A

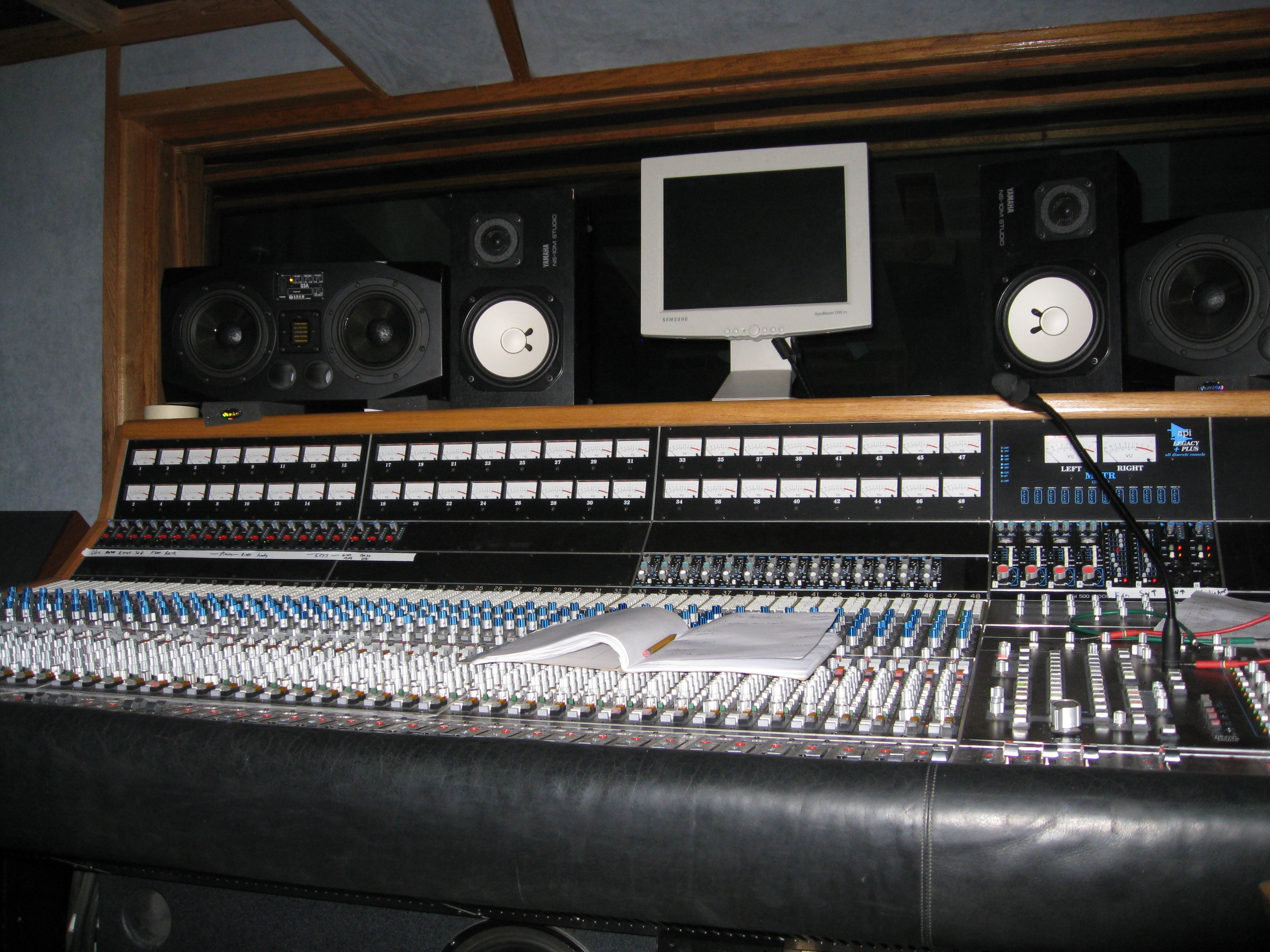
48-ch Legacy Plus all-discrete audio console with flying faders at Supernatural Sound Recording Studio

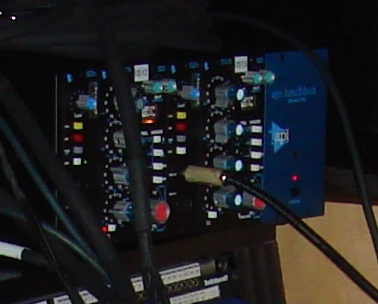
500-6B Lunchbox System: 512C Mic/Line Preamp (×2); 550B 4-band EQ (×2); 525 Compressor (×2)

Automated Processes, Inc (API) was founded in 1969 by Lou Lindauer and Saul Walker two years after they designed a mixing console for Apostolic Recording Studio, the first 12-track recording studio in New York City.

The first commercial API mixing console, a modular design combining the newly developed 500-series format signal processor units was sold to Sound Ideas in New York as API rose to the challenge of capturing high quality audio that defined the era.

Staffed by engineers and musicians with a vision to create high quality professional audio gear, throughout the seventies, API mixing consoles and processors achieved considerable popularity in recording studios, including Decca, The Hit Factory, Sunset Sound, Updown Studios, RAK Studios; major broadcast facilities, including ABC, NBC, CBS, BBC; and others, including Eastman School of Music, the White House, Washington National Cathedral, the United States Marine Band. Notable users included Les Paul, Jimmy Page, Leon Russell, The Doobie Brothers, Bob Dylan, Marvin Gaye, and Stevie Wonder.

During this golden era for recording, API achieved a number of firsts, including conductive plastic faders; a computer-programmable console with automation of EQ, sends, pans and faders which eventually became Total Recall; the first Voltage Controlled Amplifier (VCA) designed by Walker; an early tape synchronizer system; and micro-processor based crosspoint intercoms for broadcast and production, which become the basis for the discrete series bus assignment system.

In 1978, Datatronix licensed the rights to API from the owners. Founder Saul Walker and most of the original engineers, including Sid Zimet, Michael Tapes, and Paul Galburt, who had designed the API 554 sweep and the 954 automated equalizers, went to work for Sound Workshop.

In 1985, the assets of API were purchased by Paul Wolff, who owned the company until 1999. Wolff introduced the API Lunchbox, a portable lunchbox-sized chassis for housing up to four API 500-series modules.

By 1992, the manufacturer’s first full Legacy console was installed in Greene Street Recording in New York.

In 1999, the assets of API were purchased by Audio Toys, Inc. (ATI), a company founded In 1988, as a manufacturer of live sound reinforcement products including the Paragon live mixing console. ATI improved quality control, manufacturing and availability of the API product line, re-establishing API as one of the leading American analog pro audio brands. New product introductions, including the Vision surround-capable studio console, as well as the re-engineering of the 1604 small-frame mixing console into the 1608 brought the API sound to a new generation of musicians and engineers.

Popularity in the 500-series format surged in the mid-2000s, and in 2006 API established the VPR Alliance, which established specification standards for the voltage, current draw, physical dimensions, and connection pins of 500-series modules to ensure compatibility with API 500-series rack systems.

In 2019, API celebrated 50 years in the music recording and production business, professing that its range of products remains firmly dedicated to Saul Walker’s original ideas and designs. The company celebrated its golden anniversary with a party at Sony Music Hall in New York City, releasing a limited run of 550A, 312 and 2500 50th Anniversary Edition modules and 862 channel strip with gold faceplates. The 550A Anniversary Edition module went on to win a TEC Award in 2020, along with API’s 2248 console.

== Products ==
=== 500-series ===
API's modular design allows individual signal processor modules to be added to a recording system as budget allows. API's 500-series modules include the 512C preamplifier, the 525 compressor, the 527 compressor, the 550A and 550B semi-parametric equalizers, and the 560 graphic equalizer.

- 505-DI: Direct Input
- 512c: Mic/Line Preamp
- 512v: Mic/Line Preamp
- 525: Compressor
- 527: Compressor
- 529: Stereo Compressor
- 535-LA: Line Amplifier
- 550A: 3-band Equalizer
- 550b: 4-band Equalizer
- 560: Graphic Equalizer
- 565: Filter Bank
- 8 Slot High Current Lunchbox
- 6 Slot High Current Lunch Box
- 500 VPR 10-slot Rack
