= The In Crowd =

The In Crowd may refer to:

== Film ==
- The In Crowd (1988 film), a 1960s period drama directed by Mark Rosenthal
- The In Crowd (2000 film), a teen thriller directed by Mary Lambert

== Sports ==
- The In Crowd (wrestling), a World Wrestling Entertainment tag team consisting of John Morrison and The Miz

== Music ==
- The In-Crowd (British band), later known as Tomorrow, a 1960s English psychedelic rock band
- The In Crowd (Jamaican band), a 1970s reggae band

=== Albums ===
- The In Crowd (Ramsey Lewis album), 1965
- The In Crowd (Kidz in the Hall album), 2008

=== Songs ===
- "The 'In' Crowd", a 1964 song by Dobie Gray, written by Billy Page
- "The In Crowd", a 1977 song by Cal Smith written by Jerry McBee and Fred Lehner, also covered by John Conlee in 1979
- "The In Crowd", a 2009 song by American actor and singer Mitchel Musso
