= Tula's Restaurant and Jazz Club =

Defunct establishment in Seattle, Washington, U.S.

- Interactive map of Tula's Restaurant and Jazz Club

Restaurant information
- Location: 2214 2nd Avenue, Seattle, King, Washington, 98121, United States
- Coordinates: 47°36′49″N 122°20′41″W

Tula's Restaurant and Jazz Club operated in Seattle's Belltown neighborhood for more than twenty years.

== See also ==
- List of jazz venues in the United States
