= Brasserie Montmartre =

Defunct restaurant and jazz club in Portland, Oregon, U.S.

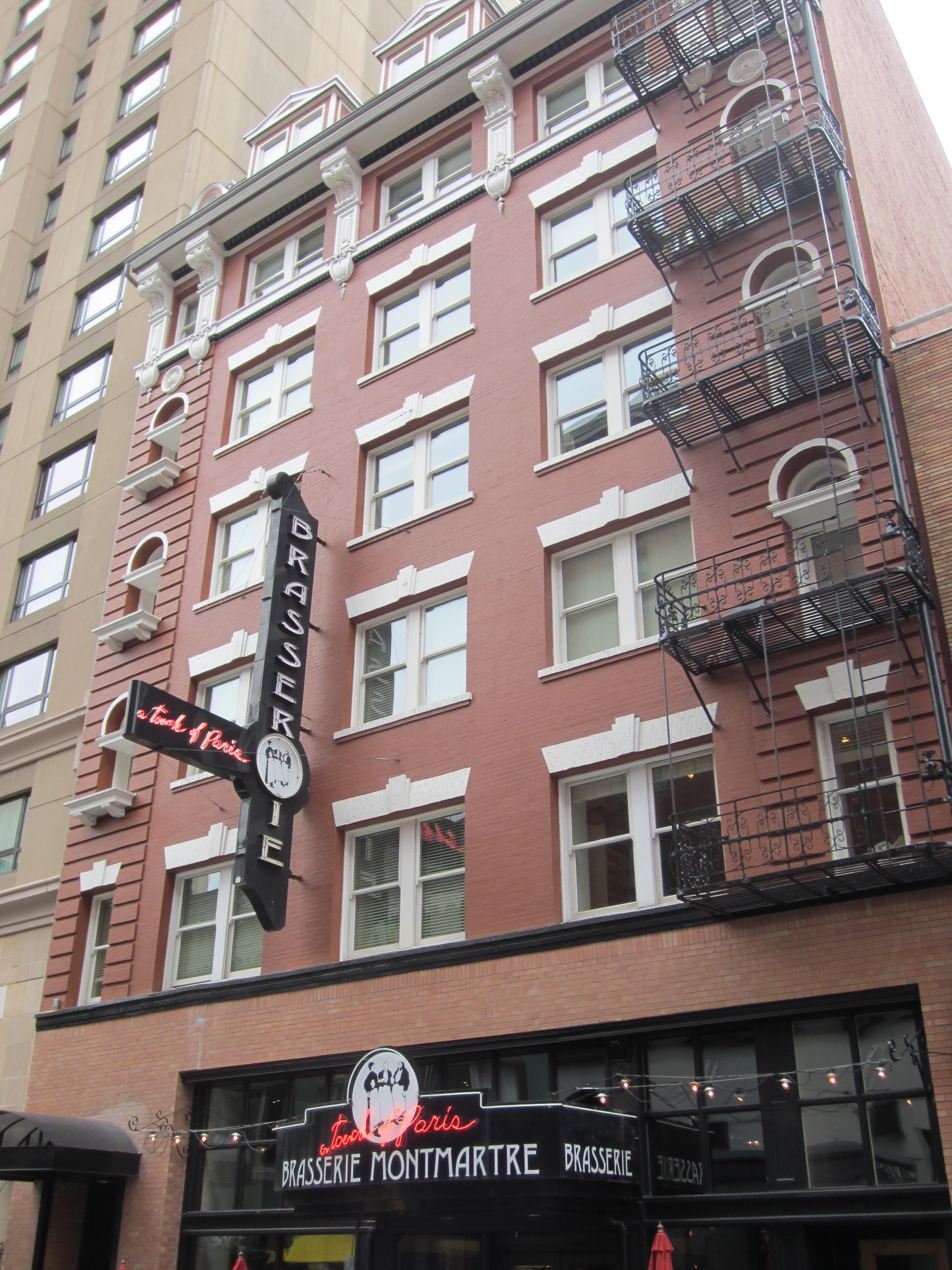
- The restaurant's exterior in May 2013
- Interactive map of Brasserie Montmartre

Restaurant information
- Established: 1978; 2009; May 2012
- Closed: 2006; 2011; April 30, 2015
- Food type: French; Mediterranean
- Location: 626 SW Park Avenue, Portland, Multnomah, Oregon, 97205, United States
- Coordinates: 45.51981°N 122.68031°W

Brasserie Montmartre was a French, and later Mediterranean, restaurant and jazz club in Portland, Oregon, in the United States.

== Description and history ==
Brasserie Montmartre was a restaurant and jazz club that operated three different times in Portland, Oregon. The original restaurant, which featured French cuisine, opened in 1978 and was described by The Oregonian as having "customer-drawn crayon art on the walls, black-and-white checkered floors, nightly jazz and a solid food menu". It closed in 2006.

New owners Matt and Sara Maletis, who were longtime Portland residents, re-opened the French restaurant in 2009. The couple signed a twenty-year lease and spent nearly $1 million renovating its interior. However, Brasserie was closed a year and a half later, in 2011.

Carl Coffman, the building owner, and chefs Pascal Chureau and Michael Hanaghan re-opened the restaurant for a third time in May 2012. Coffman and Chureau had purchased the restaurant in the spring of 2011. According to The Oregonian, the most recent iteration of Brasserie served "accessible French food with a relaxed vibe". In 2012, Chureau sold his share of the business and the restaurant's menu began offering more Mediterranean cuisine options. It closed for the third time on April 30, 2015.

== Reception ==
Brasserie was known for featuring roving musicians. According to Eater's Danielle Centoni, Chureau's iteration of Brasserie received "good marks for solid, classic, French brasserie fare, including flights of frites fried in a range of fats". The third and final iteration of the restaurant received mostly positive reviews.

== See also ==
- Culture of Portland, Oregon
- List of French restaurants
- List of jazz venues in the United States
