= Paul Wolff (engineer) =

Audio engineer and entrepreneur

- Occupations: Entrepreneur; audio engineer
- Known for: Designing recording and audio mixing equipment
- Awards: Inducted into the NAMM TEC Awards Hall of Fame for the 1985 API Audio Lunchbox 500-series module housing

Paul Wolff is an American electronics engineer and entrepreneur, who is a designer of professional audio recording equipment. He designs recording consoles including immersive and audio mixing equipment for professional recording. He has been associated with companies including Datatronix, API, Tonelux, and Fix Audio Designs. His customers include Jim Messina, Jimmy Jam and Terry Lewis, and Startec Studios among others.

Wolff was inducted into the TEC Awards Hall of Fame for creating the API Lunchbox. He is a frequent speaker on panels for the Audio Engineering Society (AES).

== Early life ==
Wolff was born in Traverse City, Michigan northwest of Cadillac to Gene and Pat (née Kasler). He has a brother Glenn and sister Lisa. Both of his parents were musicians. His paternal grandfather, Albert Wolff, served as an artilleryman in World War I. Albert Wolff was part of a military review of 250 of the tallest American soldiers chosen to form an honor guard for King George V and received a personal letter of commendation from the king after returning from the U.S. Pat Wolff wrote "I Ran Away With An All-Girl Band" a book about her time in the all-female swing band Victory Sweethearts.

Paul Wolff began his career as the front of house sound engineer for The Bayou, a venue and nightclub in Washington, D.C. for performers including Foreigner, Pat Benatar, Dire Straits, and others.

=== Associated companies ===
==== Datatronix and API ====
In 1978, Wolff began working in the console business at Datatronix just after the company had acquired Automated Processes, Inc., (API). In 1985 Wolff, purchased API, the audio assets of Datatronix that were put up for sale. After buying it, For legal reasons he was not able to use the original name of the company. He renamed it "API Audio Products". Among his customers was Startec in Washington, D.C. who opened a new 24-track facility in 1983 with a custom built API console.

In 1987 Wolff, the API president, announced the successful conversion of manufacturing the 2520 op-amp to an automated assembly "drastically reduces costs without affecting the sound at all". In 1999, upon the sale of API Audio Products to the ATI Group, best known as manufacturers of public address consoles, they incorporated under the original "Automated Processes" name.

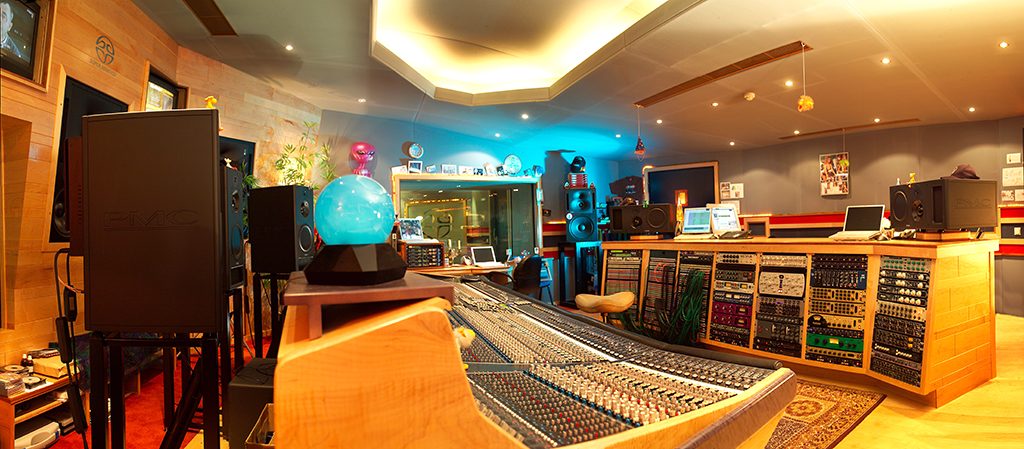
The API control room in Galaxy Studios in Mol, Belgium east of Antwerp, May 2006

In 2003, as director of engineering Wolff designed the Vision console with input from Galaxy Studios' head engineer Ronald Prent, after Prent requested a custom-built six-channel version of API'S two-channel 2500 mastering compressor. In August 2003, the first Vision Surround Mixing Console was installed in Galaxy Studios in Belgium.

==== Lunchbox ====
Around 1985 after Aphex discontinued the 500 series rack, Wolff, as the new owner of API, received approval from Marvin Caesar, president of Aphex, to make the 500 series Lunchbox. At the time, the Lunchbox was in a 4-slot format. The name "Lunchbox" was coined by Art Kelm as he had been buying the original boxes from Aphex and calling them lunchboxes.

==== Tonelux ====
Wolff founded Tonelux Designs Ltd, manufacturing modular recording equipment and became its owner and designer. He then sold the company to PMI Audio Group in March 2010.

==== Fix Audio Designs, Slate Media ====
Wolff joined Slate Media Technology Team as a hardware design specialist on the RAVEN Multi-Touch Console series, Slate Monitor Controller, and VMS-1 Mic Preamplifier.

In 2015, Wolff created Fix Audio Designs.

=== Work with Jim Messina ===
In September 2015, Wolff co-produced and recorded Jim Messina's live shows for his "In The Groove" album. Recording locations included the Lobero Theatre in Santa Barbara, California and the Clark Center for the Performing Arts in Arroyo Grande, California southeast of San Luis Obispo. Wolff said, "I streamed it live with HD video, while mixing front of house, while mixing front row seats, while mixing mono mix for the monitor guy, while mixing side fills, while tracking. We took two nights and mixed for three months."

==== Wolff Audio ====
Wolff founded Wolff Audio with Jared Vogt. The company is based in Santa Barbara, California. Gregg Wells mixed the Wicked soundtrack on the Wolff Audio 48-Channel analog console.
