= Cappozoli's =

Cappozoli's was an Italian restaurant and jazz club in Las Vegas, Nevada, United States. It was situated at 3333 South Maryland Parkway, several miles to the east of the Las Vegas Strip. The venue stayed open until 4 am and was popular with residents of the city.

The restaurant was established in 1985 by Bobby Capozzoli and his brothers, Michael and Joe Capozzoli, from a restaurant family. Bobby also owned Tower Pizza on the Strip, associated with Frank Sinatra. Over the years guests included Tom Jones, Jerry Lewis, The Righteous Brothers, Steve Lawrence and his wife Eydie Gormé, Robert Goulet, Joe Pesci and Connie Stevens. Regular local performers at the club included Danny Gans, Amazing Johnathan, Clint Holmes, Pat Morita and Lance Burton. It was sold by Mickey Capozzoli to Rocco Sorrano in 2005 and burned down in a fire in September 2007.

Bob Rush of Cadence noted in 2000: "Based on the stream of outstanding CDs recorded there, Capozzoli's must be one heck of a club. Whoever does the booking has an ear for giants of brass"... International Trombone Journal described the club as "legendary", remarking that "the many fine recordings made there set a very high standard" . The trombonist Carl Fontana reportedly died in 2003 while listening to his CD which he recorded at the club in 1999, "Live at Capozzoli's."
