= The Haig =

Jazz club in Hollywood, California, USA

Coordinates: 34.0621°N 118.2964°W

The Haig

The Haig Dinners was a jazz club located at 638 South Kenmore Avenue in the Wilshire District, Los Angeles, California. Along with the Tiffany Club it was one of Los Angeles's premier jazz venues in the 1950s and strongly associated with West Coast jazz.

== History ==
Author James Lincoln Collier describes the club as "the best-known Los Angeles jazz club of the day". It was located across from the Ambassador Hotel, which housed the famous supper club, The Cocoanut Grove. The Haig club was originally a bungalow home which was converted by owner John Bennett into a club. It has been described as looking more like a doll house than a club. In early 1952 Gerry Mulligan walked into the club and found Erroll Garner, Bobby Short, and others jamming without amplification. He joined in on an informal Monday night jam. He would later take over the jam night. Mulligan would audition and work with artists such as Chet Baker, Chico Hamilton and Bob Whitlock and many others.

In its time, Erroll Garner, Shorty Rogers, Red Norvo, Laurindo Almeida, Ornette Coleman, Buddy Collette and Bud Shank all played the club. Gerry Mulligan's first California band was formed at The Haig and maintained an eleven-month engagement there beginning in the spring of 1952. This edition of the Gerry Mulligan quartet would help to bring trumpeter Chet Baker to prominence. In its short life the pianoless quartet released several records for Richard Bock's Pacific label. (Note: At the time, Bock was the press manager for The Haig; he hired Mulligan and his quartet. The musicians made enough of an impression on Bock to prompt him to borrow money to record the group. The recordings were the start of Bock's record company and also of Gerry Mulligan's rise to prominence.)

== Live recordings ==
- Harry Edison - Sweets at the Haig (Pacific 4)
- Gerry Mulligan - Gerry Mulligan Quartet with Lee Konitz (Pacific 2)
- Gerry Mulligan - Lee Konitz and the Gerry Mulligan Quartet (Pacific 10)
- Chet Baker and Stan Getz - West Coast Live (Pacific Jazz, 1953 [1997])
- Bud Shank Featuring Claude Williamson, Don Prell, And Chuck Flores- Live At The Haig (Choice Records, 1985 [1956])

== See also ==
- List of jazz clubs
- West Coast jazz

== Sources ==
- Collier, James Lincoln (1995). Jazz: The American Theme Song. Oxford University Press. ISBN 978-0-1953-5722-6.
- Gavin, James (2011). Deep in a Dream: The Long Night of Chet Baker. Chicago Review Press. ISBN 978-1-5697-6903-4.
- Gioia, Ted (1998). West Coast Jazz: Modern Jazz in California 1945-1960. University of California Press. ISBN 978-0-5202-1729-4.
- Goldberg, Joe (1965). Jazz Masters of the Fifties. Da Capo Press. p. 15. ISBN 978-0-3068-0197-6. "haig los angeles jazz."
- Starr, Kevin (1991). Material Dreams: Southern California Through the 1920s. Oxford University Press. ISBN 978-0-1950-7260-0.

Length 496 pages
