= DC Youth Orchestra Program =

DC Youth Orchestra Program (DCYOP)
- Youth orchestra
- Founded: 1960
- Website: dcyop.org

The DC Youth Orchestra Program (DCYOP) is an ensemble-based music education program in Washington, D.C. Founded in 1960 on the request of DC Public Schools to be the city's youth orchestra, DCYOP enrolls over 600 students ages 4–18 every year from the DC metro area.

DCYOP serves as a model for the community, uniting students from different backgrounds with a shared passion, and is the District's only PreK-12 program that seeks to make high-quality, ensemble-based music education available to all students, regardless of socioeconomic status or ability. All students who are interested in learning a musical instrument are accepted into the program and tuition assistance is offered on a sliding scale so that the program is affordable and accessible to every family. In addition, to further remove barriers to music participation for at-risk students, DCYOP offers tuition-free Children's Orchestra programming on-site at three Title I DC public elementary schools. DCYOP also offers a two-week Summer Chamber Music Intensive and a one-week Summer Orchestra Intensive.

DCYOP graduates enjoy successful careers across many disciplines. Alumni are professional musicians in the National Symphony Orchestra and other orchestras, Grammy and Emmy Award winners, New York Times best-selling authors, CEOs, cancer surgeons, Broadway stars, "Saturday Night Live" cast members, and civic leaders including DC Mayor Muriel Bowser. Many alumni point to DCYOP as a significant factor in their success.

DCYOP's current executive director is Loretta Thompson. Evan Ross Solomon serves as artistic and music director.

== History ==
- 1960 – DCYOP was founded by Lyn McLain at the request of DC Public Schools, with a handful of teachers and 60 students, at Roosevelt High School
- 1961 – DCYOP's first season begins at Calvin Coolidge Senior High School
- 2006 – Founder Lyn McLain retires
- 2010 – DCYOP celebrates its 50th anniversary
- 2010 – DCYOP relocates to Eastern Senior High School
- 2019 – DCYOP relocates to Takoma Education Campus

== International tours ==
- 1970 – Switzerland
- 1972 – Germany
- 1974 – Scotland
- 1978 – Japan
- 1981 – Greece and Yugoslavia
- 1984 – Puerto Rico
- 1986 – China, Hong Kong, and Taiwan
- 1987 – Puerto Rico and South Korea
- 1988 – Puerto Rico, Russia, and Estonia
- 1989 – Spain
- 1992 – Spain
- 1994 – Netherlands, France, and Belgium
- 1996 – Netherlands and Belgium
- 1999 – Austria and Germany
- 2002 – South Africa
- 2003 – Japan
- 2014 – Colombia
- 2016 – Chile
- 2018 – Italy
- 2022 – Spain and Portugal
- 2024 – Germany, Austria, and Czechia
- 2026 - South Africa
