= Gullifty's =

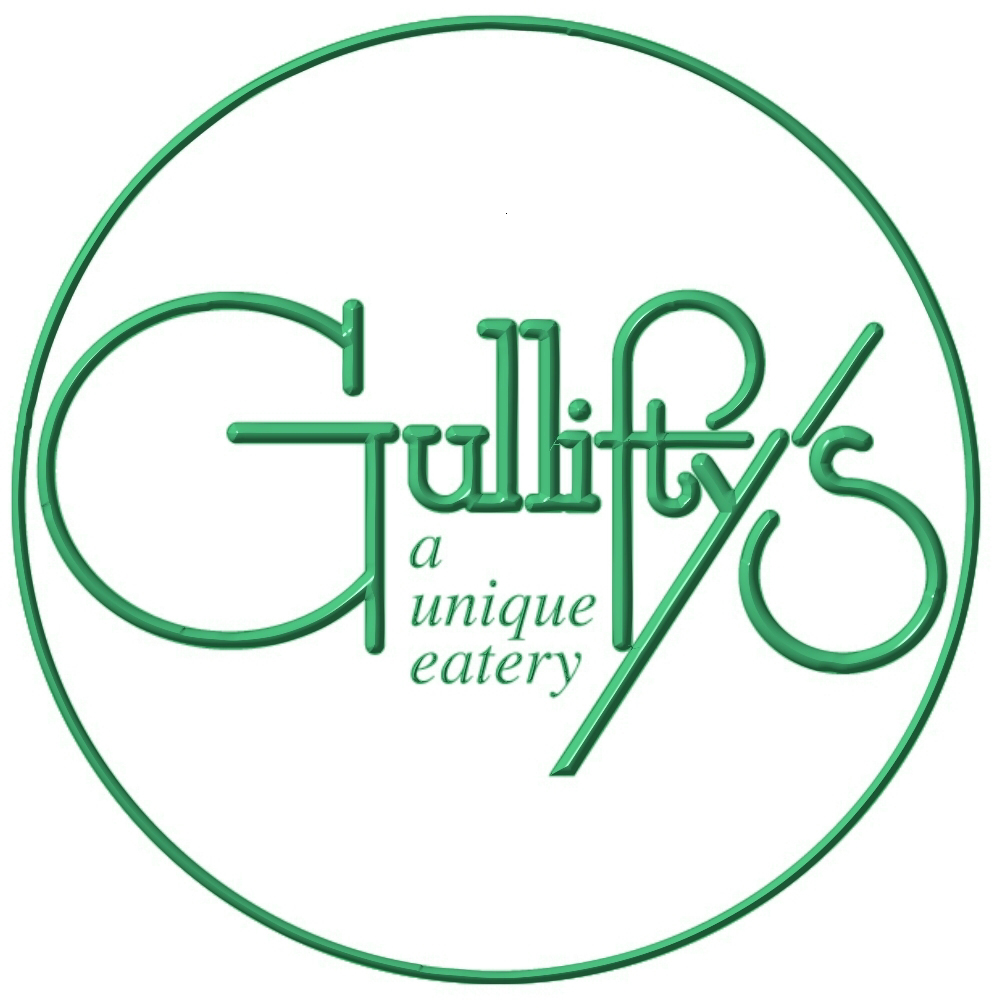
- Interactive map of Gullifty's

Restaurant information
- Established: 1982
- Closed: August 28, 2013
- Location: 1922 Murray Avenue (Squirrel Hill), Pittsburgh, Pennsylvania
- Coordinates: 40°26′7.0908″N 79°55′22.923″W
- Website: gulliftys.us at the Wayback Machine (archived June 3, 2013)

Gullifty's was a restaurant in Pittsburgh, Pennsylvania. It was a "cross between a diner and a traditional restaurant," serving fare described as "American eclectic" cuisine Gullifty's was a Pittsburgh landmark known for its desserts.

The building, located at 1922 Murray Avenue in the Squirrel Hill neighborhood of Pittsburgh had 2 levels seating 150 diners. The interior was decorated concord grape, avocado, and cinnamon colors, with brick walls, and high ceilings. During week nights, Gullifty's would serve 150 guests for dinner, with 300 to 400 on weekend nights. It also had a stage that hosted jazz concerts in the evening; Michael Machosky from the Pittsburgh Tribune-Review called Gullifty's "the city's premier jazz club, mostly by default."

Fred Rogers, of Mister Rogers' Neighborhood renown, and his family frequently dined at Gullifty's.

== History ==
Gullifty's opened in 1982, with the original concept seeking to combine a pizzeria, delicatessen, and Italian American restaurant. Additional locations in Pennsylvania were opened in Altoona, Philadelphia, Whitehall, and Camp Hill (near Harrisburg), in addition to the Squirrel Hill location, making it a regional chain. Additional locations were later opened on the campus of Carnegie Mellon University.

Brothers Mark and Matt Hastie purchased Gullifty's from the original owners in 1990. Matt, a 1978 graduate of Mt. Lebanon High School, had previously worked as a cook at the restaurant.

In 2006, the weekly jazz shows began. In 2008, the Squirrel Hill building was damaged by fire. In 2013, Gullifty's closed when the building was sold to The Friendship Circle, a Jewish organization that helps children and young adults with special needs by pairing them with teen volunteers. On August 28, 2013, the last day of the restaurant's operation, the restaurant was packed with people seeking dessert. Mark Hastie implied that the desserts may yet live on through another business venture.

As of 2017, the Philadelphia location is the last Gullifty's restaurant to remain open.

== Desserts ==
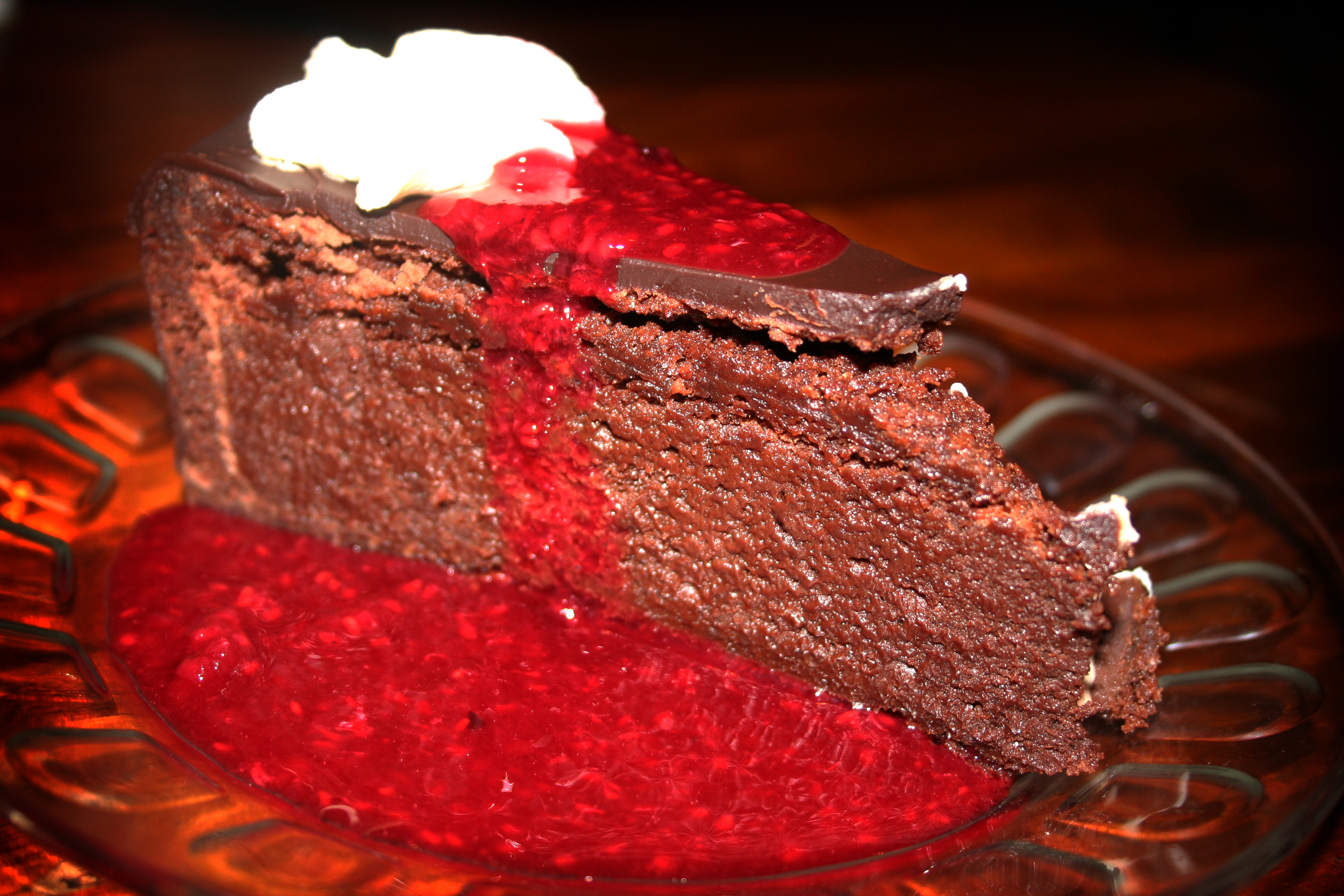
One of Gullifty's famous desserts

Gullifty's was best known for its desserts. The desserts were baked fresh daily by two full-time bakers. Among the most popular varieties were Peanut Butter Truffle Pie, Killer Kookie, 5th Dimension Cake, and Chocolate Intemperance.
