= Reesa Renee =

American singer-songwriter

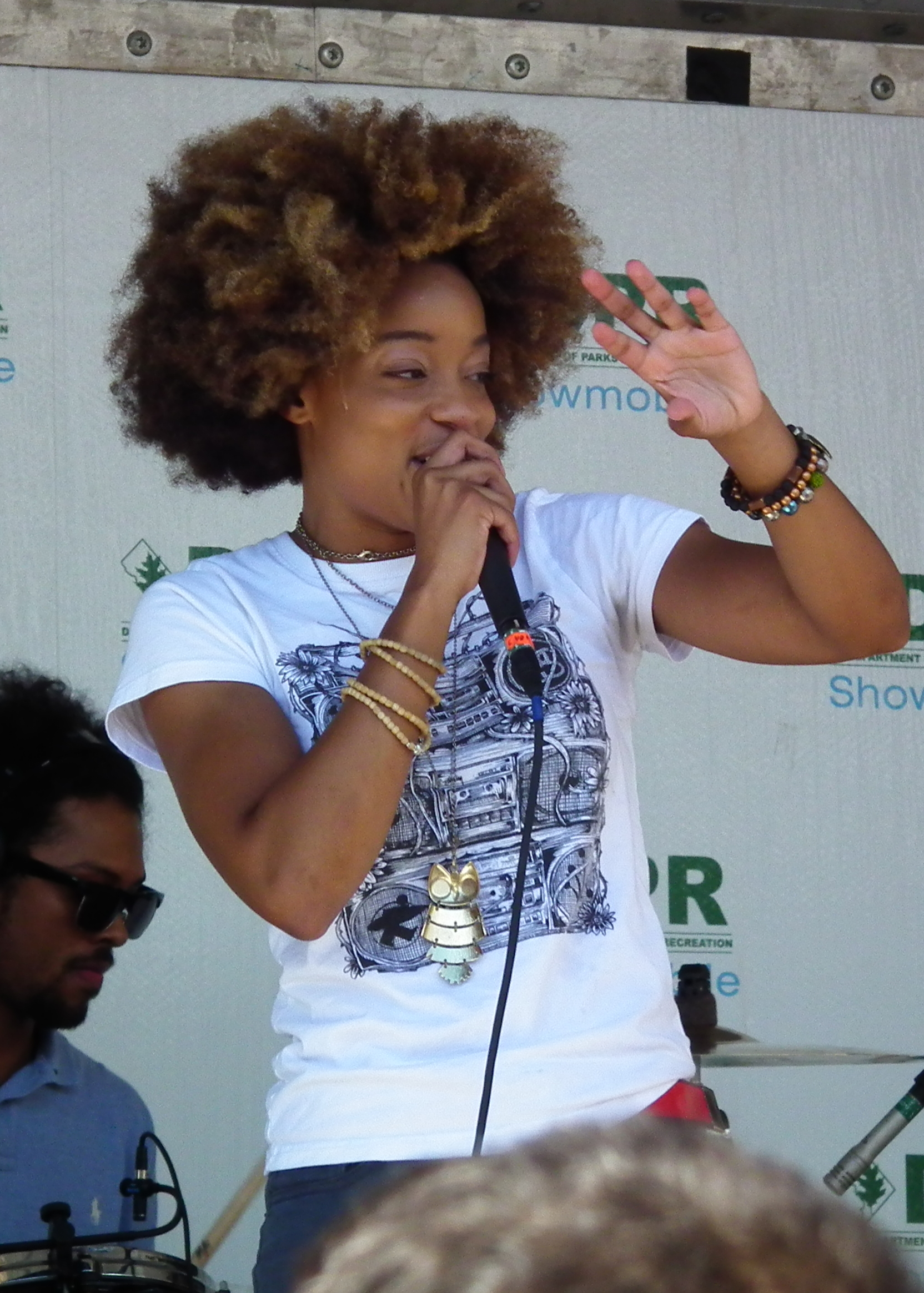

Background information
- Origin: Largo, Maryland
- Genres: R&B, neo soul, go-go
- Occupation: R&B singer
- Years active: 2011–present
- Website: www.reesarenee.com

Reesa Renee is a singer and songwriter from the Washington metropolitan area of the United States (specifically, Largo, MD). Her soulful and energetic style is exhibited in Reelease, her debut album released in August 2012. The album has features by local greats including RA the MC in "Listen". Local rapper Tabi Bonney drops in for an upbeat track "Good Day". Kamila Gem makes an appearance in the more opinionated "World Go Round". Her title track "Reelease" features artist Charissa Rouse. Her album is closed off with "Obvious", featuring local rapper Black Cobain and Silk Gates. Her debut performance was at the Fillmore in Silver Spring, Maryland. Within 24 hours of release, her album reached the top 20 of iTunes R&B.

In 2010 after being given a makeover and photo session as a birthday present, Reesa Renee began to see how she could look as a performer. Shortly after, she prepared materials and started performing at local open mics. She led off with a performance at the Village Underground in New York City. After performing only twice at the venue, the crowds were already singing along to her songs. Her confidence continued to build until she launched her solo career in 2011 and in October, became the second person to win the Amateur Night at the Apollo Theatre in the last three years with her original song, "Got Me Loose". Amateur Night has been the launching ground for many singers, including Ella Fitzgerald, Billie Holiday, James Brown, The Jackson 5, Patti LaBelle, Marvin Gaye, Luther Vandross, Stevie Wonder, Aretha Franklin, Ben E. King, Mariah Carey, and Lauryn Hill, among others.

Reesa has performed alongside musical veterans Eric Roberson, Raheem DeVaughn, Chuck Brown, Roy Ayers and Wale. She cites Jill Scott as an inspiration.
