= The Choice Four =

American soul/vocal music group

- Origin: Washington, D.C., United States
- Genres: R&B; Disco
- Labels: RCA

The Choice Four were the most consistent of the male American soul/vocal groups produced by Van McCoy. They were from Washington, D.C., recorded for RCA Records and had three albums. Several of the group's members had previously sung in The Love Tones and The Stridels. They had several minor hits on the Billboard charts in the mid-1970s. Their attempt to hit big with their version of "When You're Young and In Love" was thwarted by the simultaneous release of a disco version of the song by actor Ralph Carter (of the Good Times TV show). Their biggest hit, '"Come Down to Earth" became a favorite in the discos after the group had broken up. They recorded the original version of the David Ruffin hit "Walk Away From Love" (also produced by McCoy), hitting the high note that Ruffin famously missed. Both Pede "Pete" Marshall and Charles Blagmon went on to tour with groups led by former members of The Temptations after the group's demise, prior to its revival by Teddy Maduro.

Maduro announced his bandmate Pede Marshall died on July 13, 2017. Bobby Hamilton died on February 6, 2025.

== Members ==
- Bobby Hamilton (died 2025)
- Ted Maduro
- Pede "Pete" Marshall (died 2017)
- Charles Blagmon (a/k/a "Blackmon")

== Albums ==
- The Finger Pointers (RCA, 1974)
- The Choice Four (RCA, 1975)
- On Top of Clear (RCA, 1976) US R&B #43

=== Singles ===
Year	Title	Chart positions		
Year	Title	US Pop Singles	US R&B Singles	US Disco Singles
1974	"You're So Right for Me"	—	63	—
1974	"The Finger Pointers, Part 1"	—	85	—
1975	"Hook it Up"	—	—	4
1975	"When You're Young and in Love"	91	45	—
1976	"Hey, What's That Dance You're Doing"	107	57	—
1976	"Just Let Me Hold You For a Night"	—	76	—
1977	"Come Down to Earth/Two Different Worlds"	—	—	26
