= Victory Sweethearts =

American 1940s swing big band all-female musical group

- Origin: Midwestern United States
- Genres: Swing
- Years active: 1940s

The Victory Sweethearts was an American all-female swing big band founded in 1938. After the United States entered World War II, Victory Sweethearts toured the US appearing at USO events and military bases in support of the troops. The band was featured on national radio broadcasts. Their repertoire included numbers featuring instrumental soloists, complete arrangements for the entire ensemble, and novelties.

The Victory Sweethearts were founded by Freddie Shaffer, a musician from Frankfort, Indiana who began performing as an all-girl band with 15 girls and was the leader. The group name was inspired by the band members' deployed fiancés and the girls' desire to build morale and contribute to the victory effort.

Ruth Mary Mack played drums and was known as the female Gene Krupa. Pat Wolff wrote "I Ran Away With An All-Girl Band" a book about her time in the girls' band. Arthella Louise "Artie" Phelps went by the stage name "Louise Lust" and would dedicate songs on air to her then-fiancé, Ray.

The Victory Sweethearts played at venues including Hotel Statler, Buffalo, Castle Farm, Cincinnati; Vague Terrace, Pittsburgh; Hotel New Yorker, New York City, Palace Theatre, Cleveland; Circle Theatre, Indianapolis; and the Earle Theatre, Washington.

== Band members ==
- Freddie Shaffer, trumpet
- Ruth Mary Mack, drummer
- Ruth Tyler Christiansen, singer
- Louise Lust (stage name for Arthella Louise "Artie" Phelps), trumpet, singer
- Pat Wolff, saxophonist, clarinet
- Marlene Miller, saxophone, clarinet, piano
- Mary Caroline Bennett, trombonist
- Betty O'hara, variety of brass instruments
- Lois "Maxine" (Wright) DeLuca, bassist
- Lois A. Kuiper
