= The Bayou =

Music venue and nightclub in Washington, D.C

Coordinates: 38.9024°N 77.0619°W

- Interactive map of The Bayou
- Address: 3135 K Street, Georgetown, Washington, D.C., U.S.
- Location: Georgetown, Washington, D.C., U.S.
- Capacity: 900

Construction
- Opened: September 1953
- Closed: 1999

The Bayou was a music venue and nightclub located in the Georgetown neighborhood of Washington, D.C. The club occupied an old building at 3135 K Street, NW, in Georgetown, under the Whitehurst Freeway for forty-six years. The club opened in September 1953 on the site of a former Dixieland nightclub called The Pirates Den which featured Dixieland jazz until the early 1960s when the format changed to rock and roll. Performers included Count Basie and Woody Herman.

The club included a balcony level, with tables and chairs, and two standing room only bars. The main floor bars were fed bottled liquor from a tap room that was situated above the entrance. Bottles placed upside down into funnels feeding long tubing led to the downstairs bars. The Bayou backed up to Blues Alley, another Washington, D.C.-based music institution, located down the alley behind the Bayou.

== History ==
The club was owned from 1953 to 1980 by the Tramonte family who designed it to have an intimate atmosphere like a family. The club had a lower level area with a large raised stage and a wrap around upper balcony that overlooked the dance floor and stage below. The sound system mixing console was located on the second floor balcony, overlooking the stage. During the Tramonte's ownership of the club, Paul Wolff was the front of house engineer.

The Bayou was known for hosting benefits, including one for Toni Wilson, a singer who would frequent the club with her family.

In the late 1990s, The Bayou was owned by Dave Williams (Cellar Door Productions), who was also responsible for putting on the concerts at DAR Constitution Hall and the Capital Centre. Williams also was the GM at the Nissan Pavilion (now Jiffy Lube Live) in Manassas, VA.

== Clientele ==
Though The Bayou generally attracted an older crowd, the club also featured a diverse following including college students from Georgetown University, men and women from the many military installations in the DC area and The Pentagon.

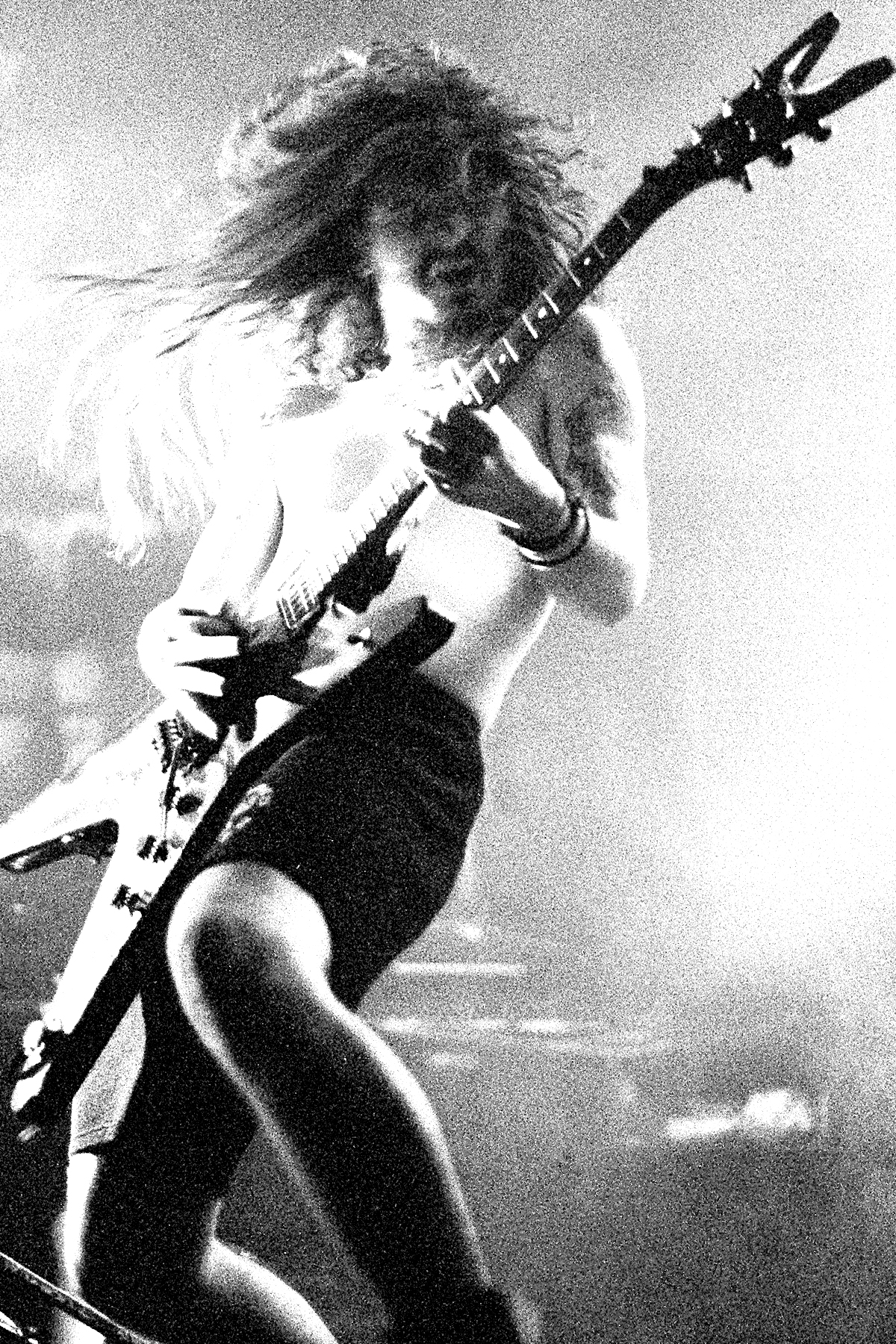
Dimebag Darrell plays with Pantera at The Bayou in 1990.

The Bayou was a stop on the national tours of musical groups and solo artists. The club, which was a regular stop on East Coast tours by UK bands from the late 1970s on, featured artists including U2 (their second show in the United States), Kiss, Guns N' Roses, Red Hot Chili Peppers (performing twice in 1988 which would be their final DC shows with founding members Hillel Slovak and Jack Irons), The Only Ones, Squeeze, Peter Tosh, Basia (1988, her first show in the United States), The Police, Duran Duran, Phish, Leftover Salmon, Dave Matthews Band, Blue Öyster Cult, Lindsey Buckingham, The New Orleans Radiators, Hootie & the Blowfish, dada, Billy Joel, Bon Jovi, Dire Straits, the Tom-Tom Club, Acoustic Junction, Steeleye Span, From Good Homes, Foreigner, The Kinks, Todd Rundgren (backed by Utopia on this stop of his 1978 Back to the Bars tour), Yellow Magic Orchestra, The Cure on their first US tour and other artists that influenced the evolution of rock as well as rhythm and blues from the 1960s through the 1990s.

== Timeline ==
- Opened 1939 as Don Dickerman's Pirate's Den.
- Changed to the Bayou in 1953 with Owners Mike Munley, Vince and Tony Tramonte.
- Converted to rock and roll in September 1965; The Telstars played the Bayou as a house band for 3 years.
- The Tramontes sell the Bayou to Cellar Door Productions in 1980.
- Eva Cassidy performed for the last time with "What a Wonderful World" at The Bayou in September 1996.
- Closed 1999.
- Razed 1999.

The Bayou was the subject of a documentary, The Bayou: DC's Killer Joint, produced by Metro Teleproductions, Inc. Maryland Public Television aired the program on February 25, 2013.
