= Republic Gardens =

Nightclub in Washington, D.C, United States

Coordinates: 38.9173°N 77.0313°W

Republic Gardens is an historic nightclub located in Washington, D.C. It first opened in the 1920s and operated as a popular nighttime music attraction for several decades. During its early years, notable musicians such as Cab Calloway and Ella Fitzgerald performed at the nightclub. After the burn out of the 60's riots, Republic Gardens closed and remained vacant until 1996, when club promoter Marc Barnes purchased and reopened the nightclub. Republic Gardens was originally renovated in 1992 by George Saah and Bob Speidel, then sold to the Whitney brothers, who then sold to Marc Barnes.

During the Marc Barnes resurrection era Republic Gardens catered to a young and professional urban crowd, setting off the momentum of resurgence for the blighted U Street corridor of Washington, D.C. making it colorful national landmark destination of the upwardly mobile African American. With an international chef as a hallmark of its offerings, and A-list celebrity events, Republic Gardens began to embed into the culture of the new DC social scene as well as the national urban lifestyle epicenter.

After purchasing Republic Gardens from Whitney Family Restaurants, Marc Barnes went on to springboard into building a 52,000 sq. foot mega club called Dream (turned LOVE) in another DC neighborhood on the brink, Ivy City and ultimately The Park at Fourteenth in the bustling heart of downtown DC.

Republic Gardens was reported to become a mixed use building for the now thriving U Street as of October 2014. It was reopened as Elements in 2021.
