= Tiffany Club =

Defunct jazz club in Los Angeles

Ella Fitzgerald and Marilyn Monroe at the Tiffany Club, 1954

Tiffany Club was a jazz club located at 3260 West 8th Street in the Wilshire district of Los Angeles. It was one of the top jazz venues in the city in the 1950s. Charlie Parker, Louis Armstrong, Stan Getz, Ornette Coleman and Chet Baker performed at the club.
