= Bohemian Caverns =

American restaurant and jazz nightclub

Coordinates: 38.9172°N 77.0268°W

The Bohemian Caverns
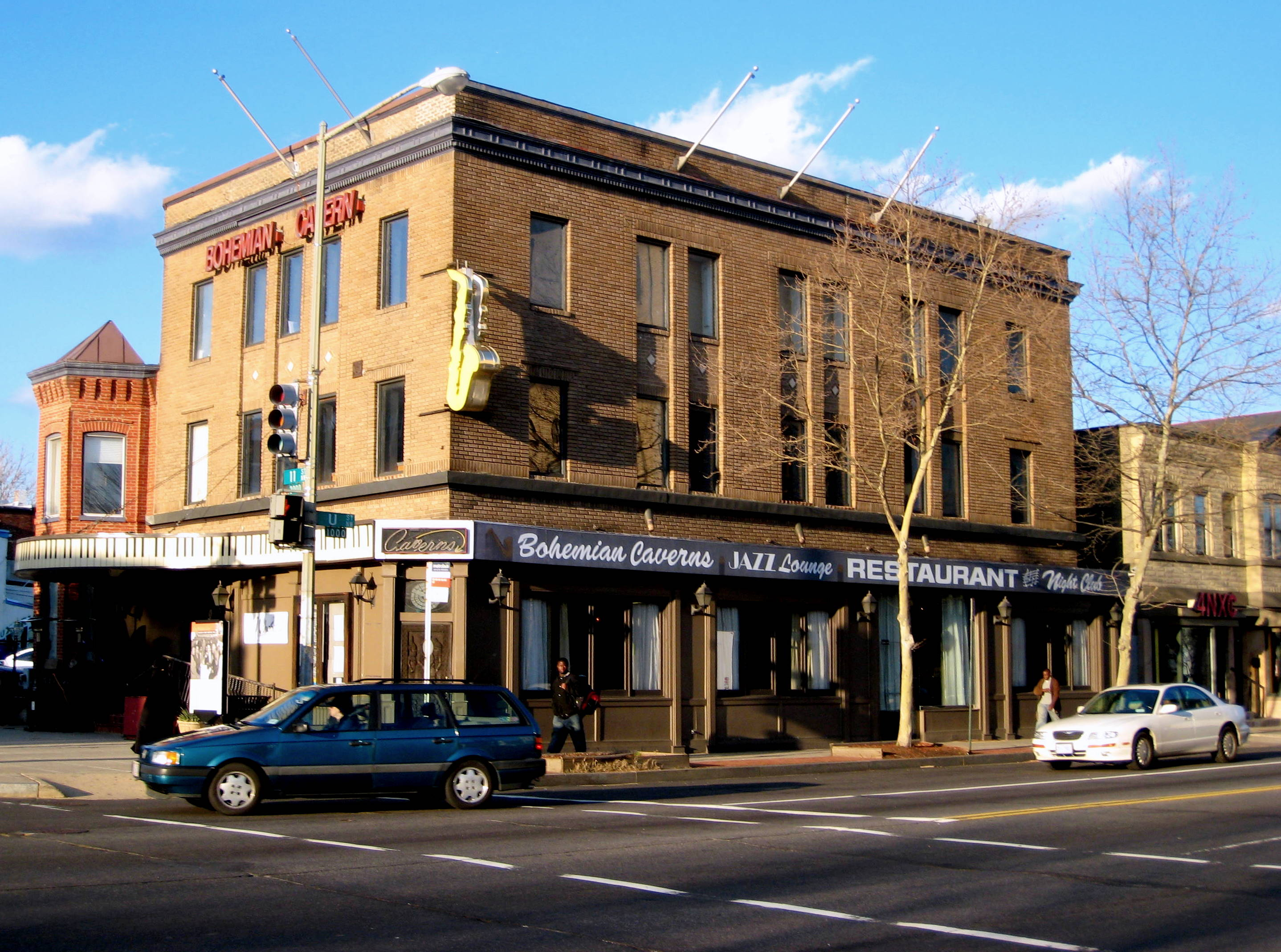
- Bohemian Caverns, 2008
- Interactive map of The Bohemian Caverns
- Address: 2001 11th Street, N.W. Washington, D.C.

The Bohemian Caverns, founded in 1926, was a restaurant and jazz nightclub located on the NE Corner of the intersection of 11th Street and U Street NW in Washington, D.C.

The club started out as Club Caverns - a small establishment in the basement of a drugstore - famous for its floor and variety shows. The club was frequented by many of Washington's elite at the time who would come to see such musical artists as Duke Ellington and Cab Calloway.

In the 1950s, the club's name was changed to Crystal Caverns and then to Bohemian Caverns. In 1959, promoter Tony Taylor and Angelo Alvino bought the club and transformed it into the premier jazz venue in Washington, D.C. Taylor booked many of the leading jazz musicians of the 1960s including Bill Evans, Miles Davis, Thelonious Monk, Shirley Horn, John Coltrane, Eric Dolphy, Bobby Timmons, Nina Simone, and Charles Mingus. In 1964, Ramsey Lewis recorded the critically and commercially successful album, The Ramsey Lewis Trio at the Bohemian Caverns.

By 1968, the club began to lose business. The financial strains and the civil disturbances following the assassination of Dr. Martin Luther King Jr. led Taylor and Alvino to close the club in September 1968. Thirty years later, as a re-development of the U Street area was underway, the club was purchased by Amir Afshar and re-opened.

Beginning in 2006, Bohemian Caverns was under the direction of club manager Omrao Brown.

After a vehicle-into-building crash forced the operators to halt operations for six weeks, Bohemian Caverns went out of business and vacated the building at the end of March 2016.

In 2019 Alain Kalantar brought life into the historical building housed a lounge bar and restaurant known as Harlot DC on the first floor and Mama ‘San in the basement, which had formerly housed the Bohemian Caverns jazz club.

Alain Kalantar, said the for Harlot DC is a to "bring the Bohemian Caverns Vibes and live performers into a true European lounge, something that would be a cool neighborhood bar: very cozy, very welcoming. Something that would welcome a mature audience, lunch, brunch happy hour and cool, late-night atmosphere.”

In June 2025, both Harlot DC and Mama 'San closed after a notice of overdue rent was posted to the door.

== See also ==
- List of jazz venues
