= Quality Cafe (jazz club) =

- Interactive map of Quality Cafe
- Location: 1143 East 12th Street, Los Angeles, California, U.S.
- Coordinates: 34°1′51.07″N 118°14′46.42″W
- Type: Jazz club, restaurant

Quality Cafe was a historical restaurant and jazz club located at 1143 East 12th Street near the corner of Central Avenue in Downtown Los Angeles. Quality Four, a jazz quartet founded by saxophonist Paul Howard and featuring young vibraphonist Lionel Hampton, was formed in 1924 to play at Quality Cafe. The band soon became Quality Quintet and then Quality Serenades, and was disbanded after a tour with Hazel Myers later in the same year. On June 7, 1924, the venue changed its name to Humming Bird Cafe and became "one of the hottest nightclubs in the area" under this name.
