= Herb Alpert's Vibrato Grill & Jazz =

Jazz club in Los Angeles

Coordinates: 34°7′37″N 118°26′37″W

Vibrato
- Interactive map of Vibrato

Restaurant information
- Established: 2004
- Owner: Herb Alpert
- Location: 2930 Beverly Glen Cir, Los Angeles, California, 90077, United States
- Website: www.vibratogrilljazz.com

Vibrato is a jazz club and restaurant on Beverly Glen Circle in Bel Air, Los Angeles, to the south of Mulholland Drive. It was established by Grammy Award-winning jazz trumpeter Herb Alpert. Ariana Savalas is a regular performer at the club.
