= Jazz in Portland, Oregon =

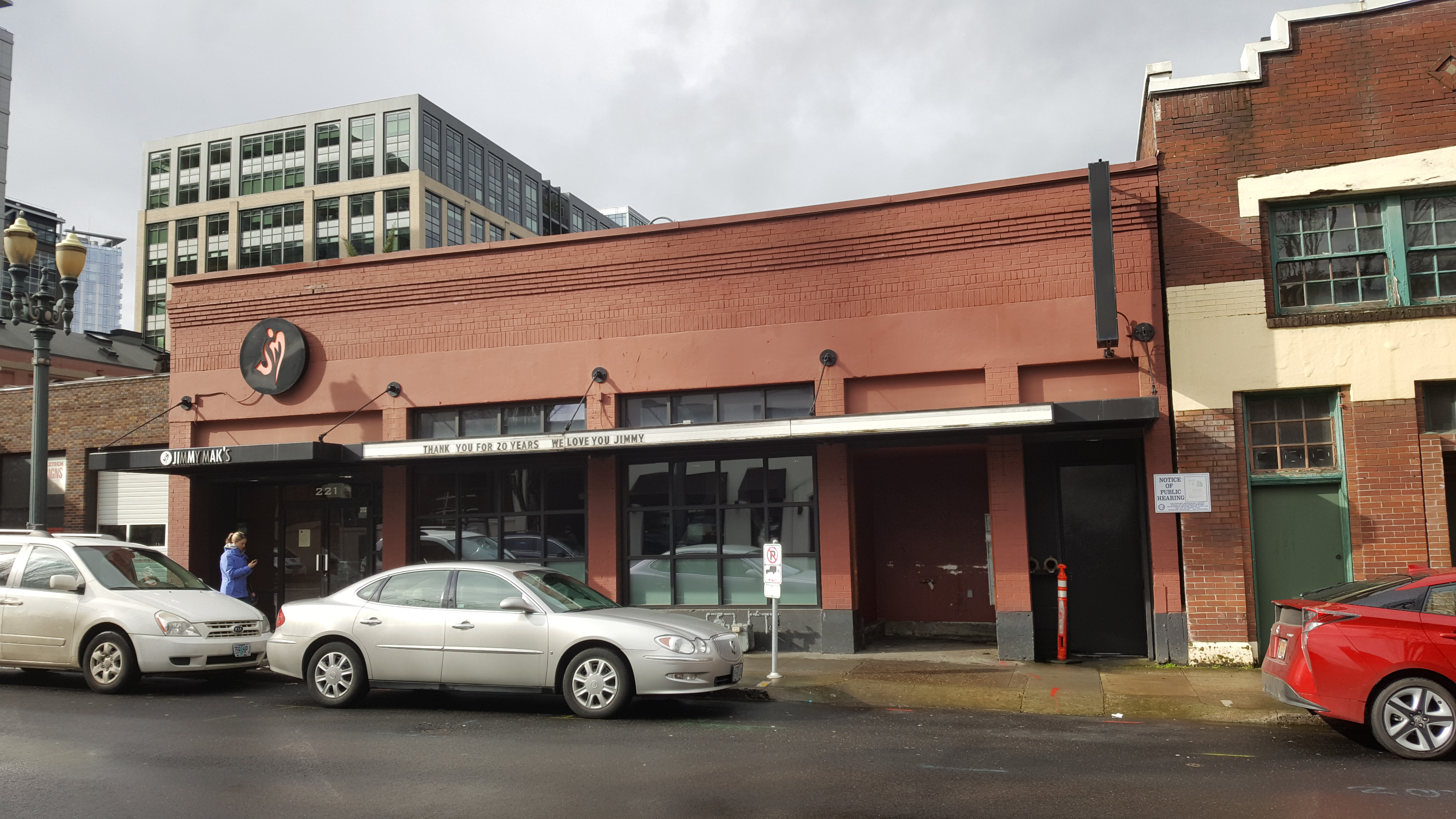
Exterior of Jimmy Mak's in 2017, after closing

In 2016, David Stuckey of Oregon Public Broadcasting wrote, "In the 1940s and '50s, Portland's jazz scene was a mixture of cultural progression and intense audio experience." In 2019, Willamette Week described Portland, Oregon's jazz scene as "constantly shifting" and said, "It often feels like the fate of Portland jazz hangs in the balance."

The Cathedral Park Jazz Festival is held annually at Cathedral Park. The Portland Jazz Festival and Vanport Jazz Festival are other recurring jazz festival in the city. Elsewhere in the Portland metropolitan area, the Mt. Hood Jazz Festival is held annually in Gresham.

== Venues ==
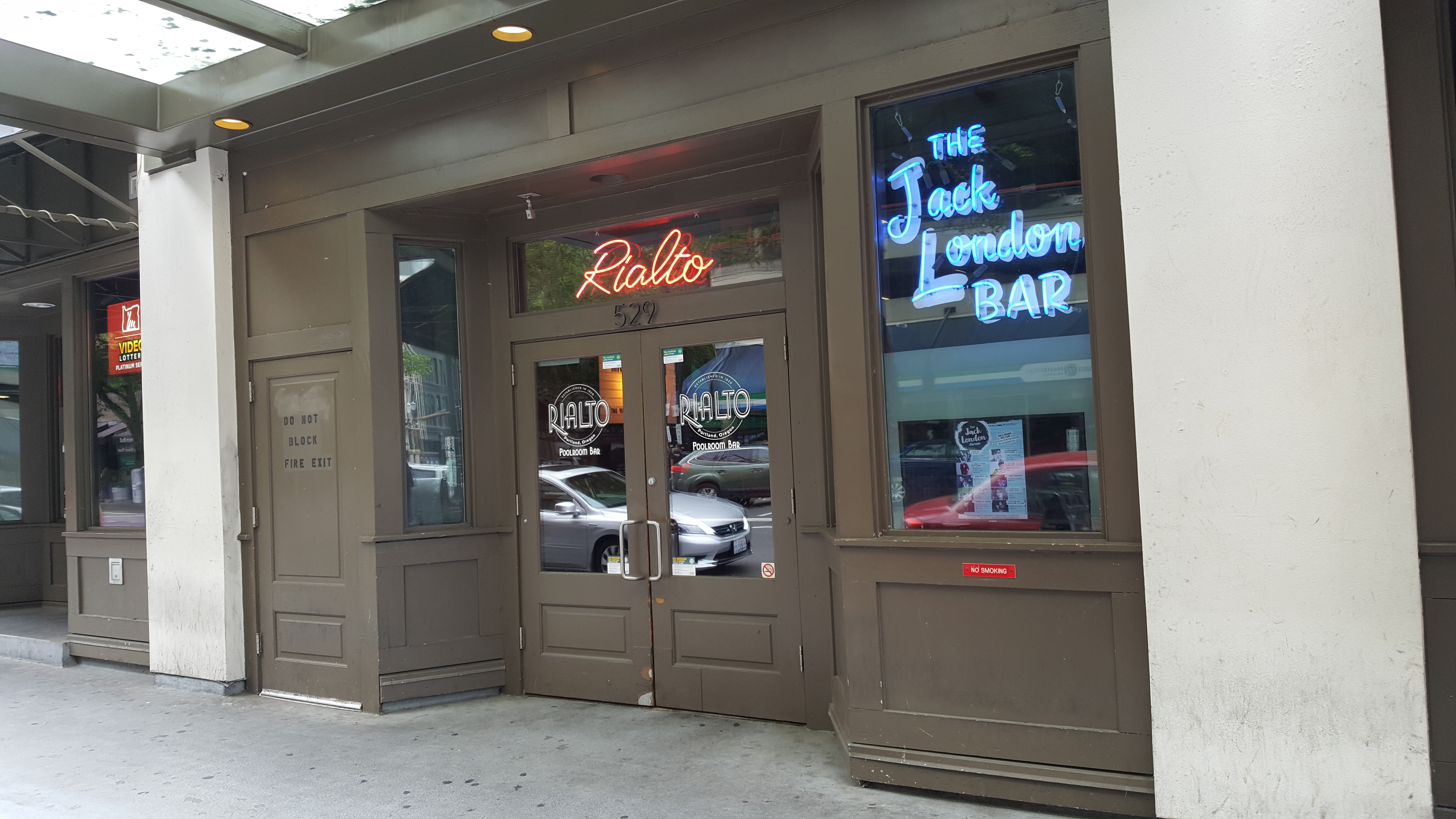
Exterior of the jazz club Jack London Revue, 2018

Jazz clubs in Portland have included Blue Monk, Brasserie Montmartre, Cotton Club, The Dude Ranch, Club Acme, Jack London Revue, Jazz de Opus, and Jimmy Mak's. The defunct restaurant Abou Karim also hosted jazz performances.

== Musicians ==
Jazz musicians with connection to the city include Mel Brown, Cleve Williams, George Bruns, Alan Jones, Nancy King, Glen Moore, and Esperanza Spalding.

== See also ==
- Culture of Portland, Oregon
