= List of music venues in Portland, Oregon =

This is a list of music venues in Portland, Oregon.

== Current venues ==
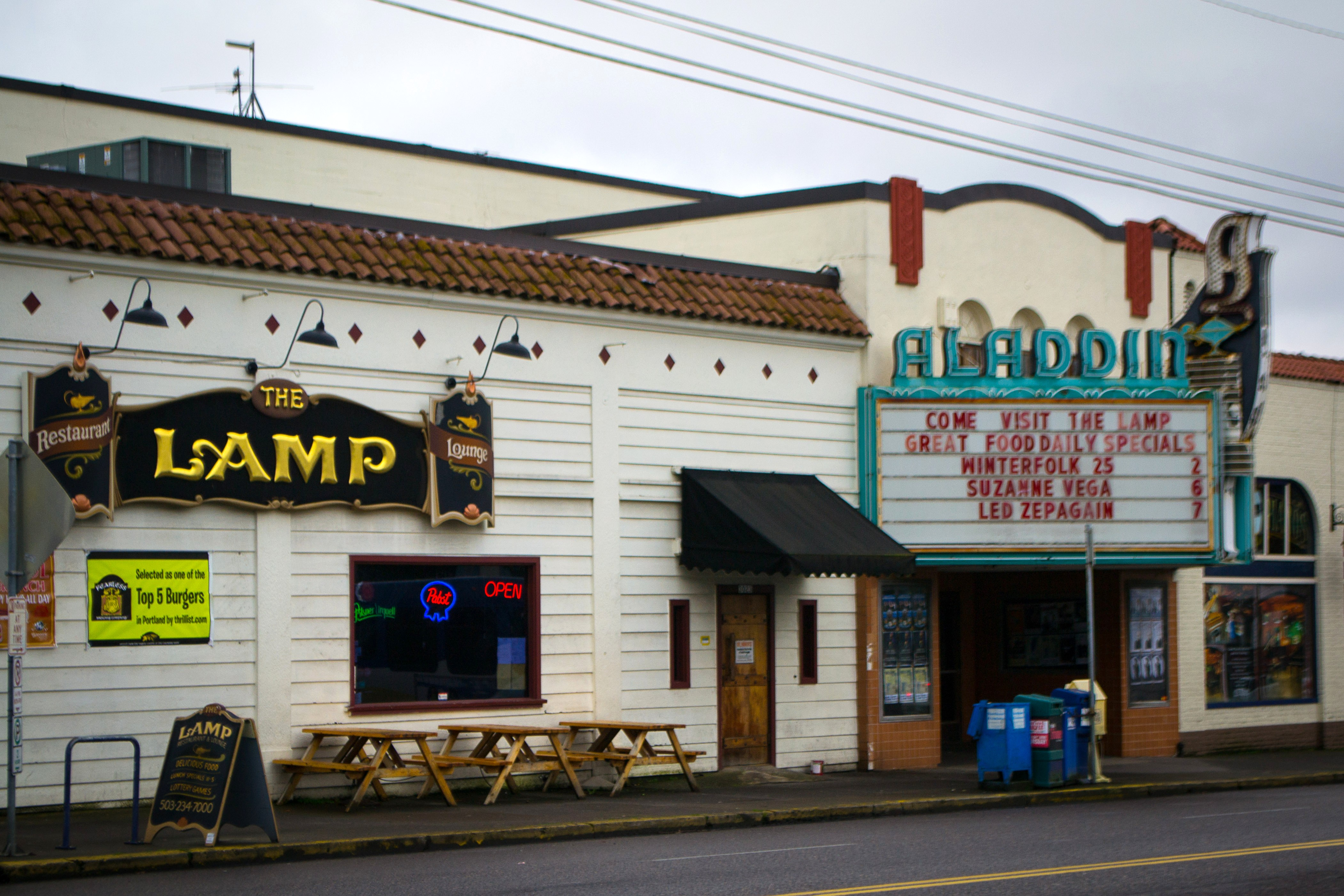
Aladdin Theater

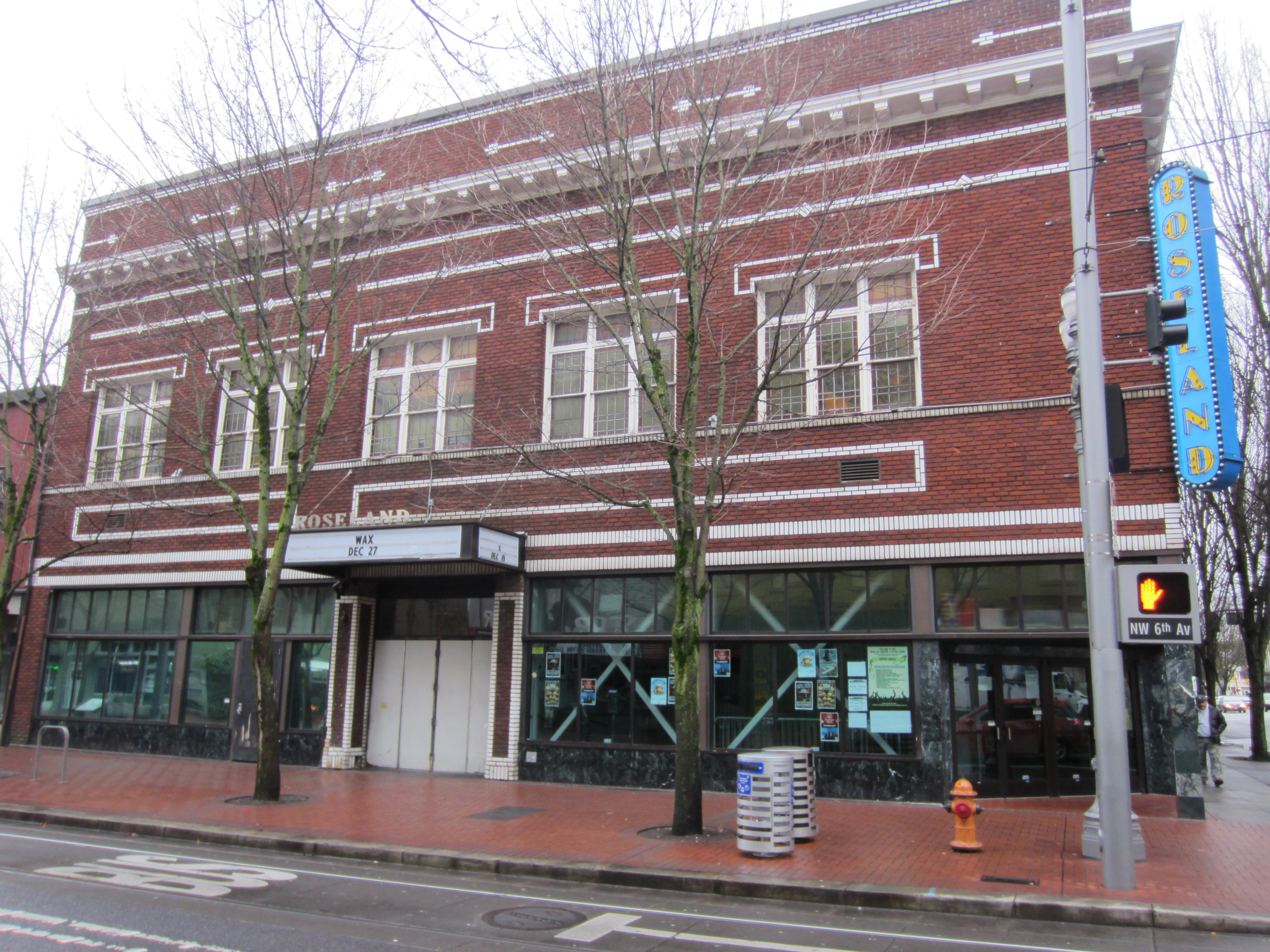
Roseland Theater, 2014

- Aladdin Theater
- Alberta Street Pub
- Antoinette Hatfield Hall
- Arlene Schnitzer Concert Hall
- Crystal Ballroom
- Dante's
- Doug Fir Lounge
- Hawthorne Theatre
- Holocene
- Jack London Revue
- Keller Auditorium
- Lola's Room
- Mississippi Studios
- Moda Center
- Oregon Zoo
- Revolution Hall
- Roseland Theater
- Spare Room Restaurant and Lounge
- Star Theater
- Veterans Memorial Coliseum
- Wonder Ballroom
- World Famous Kenton Club

== Defunct venues ==
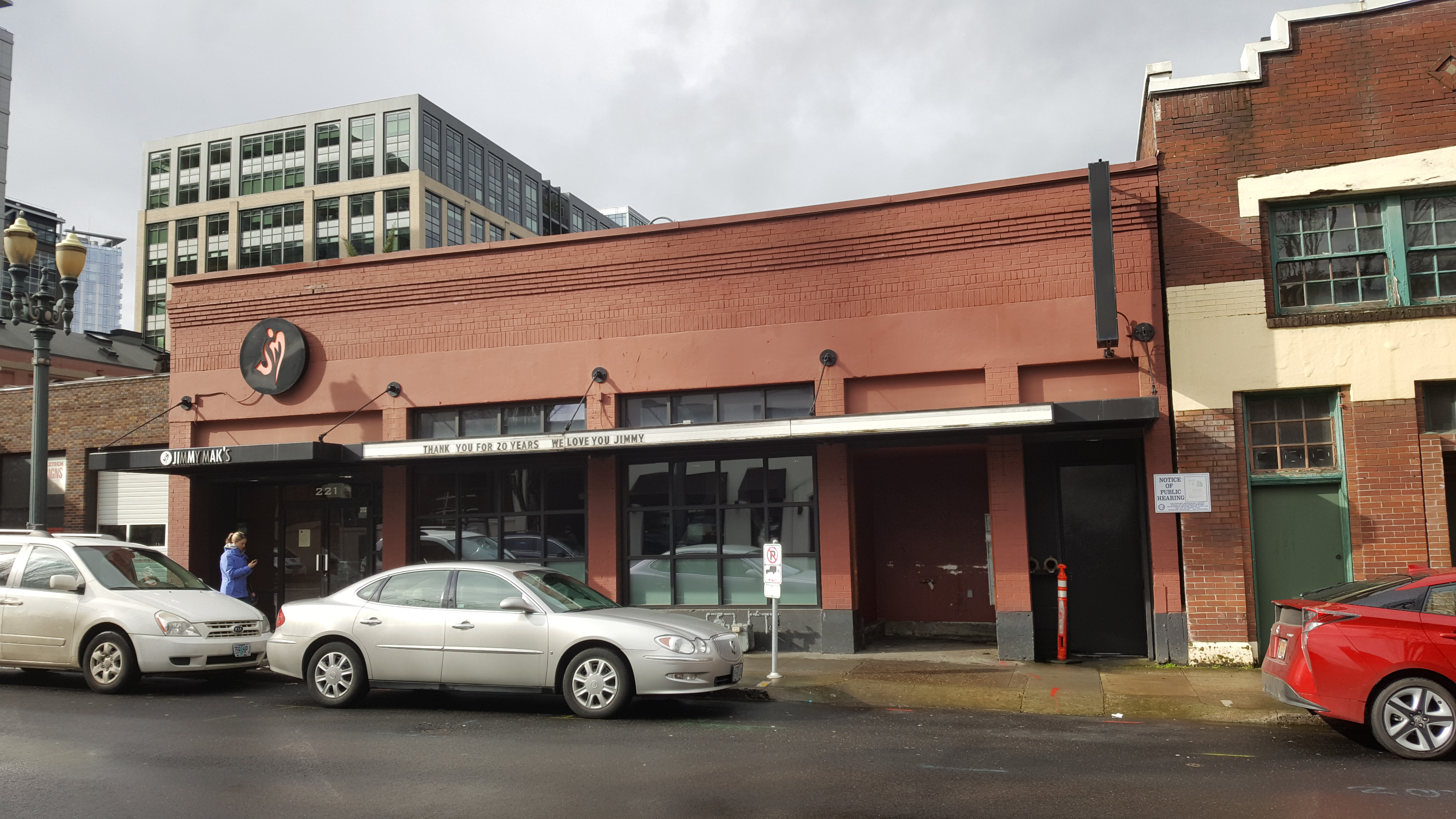
Jimmy Mak's, 2017

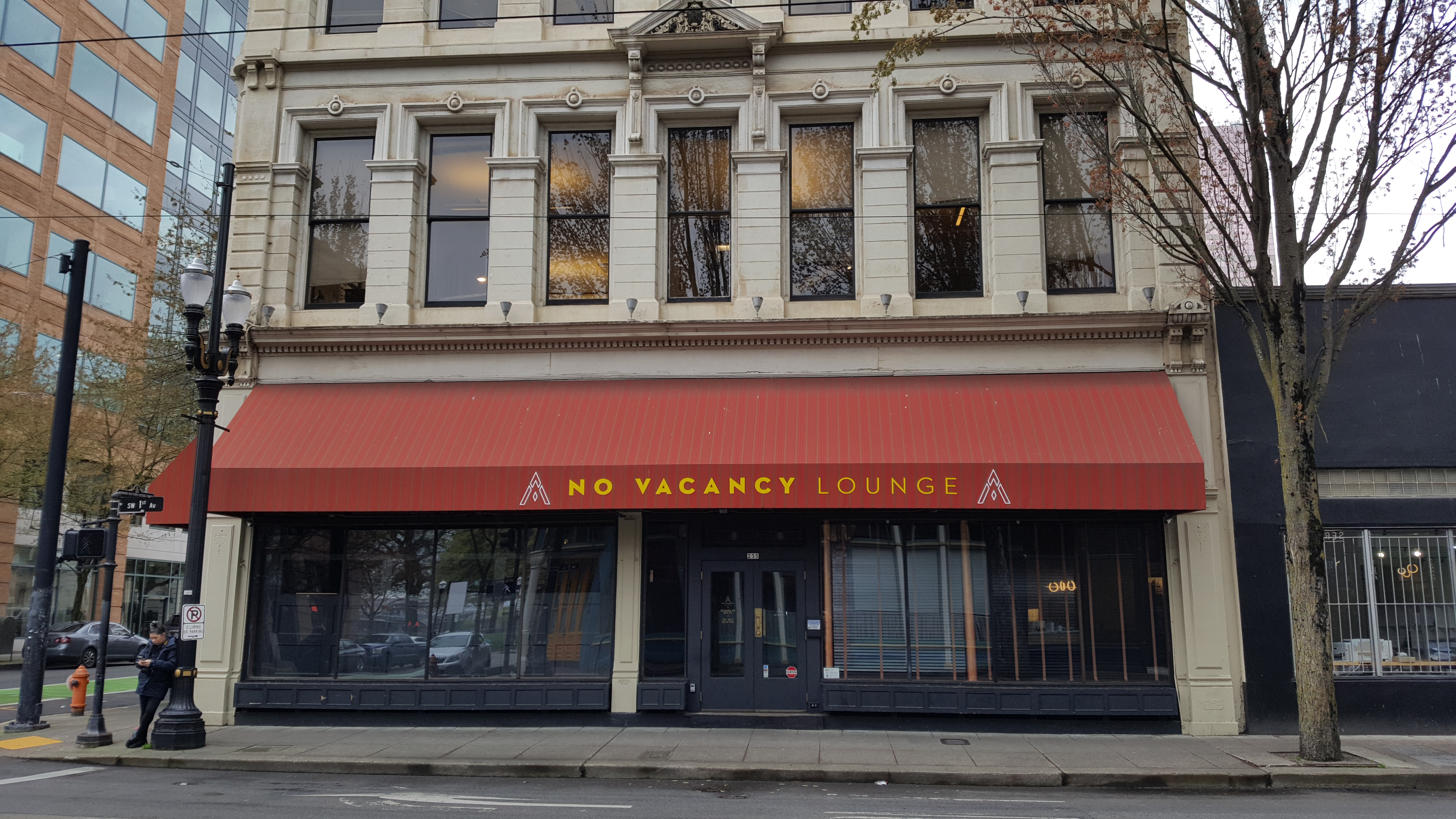
No Vacancy Lounge, 2019

- Analog Café and Theater
- Backspace
- Berbati's Pan
- Blue Monk
- Brasserie Montmartre
- Candlelight Cafe & Bar
- The Dude Ranch
- Jimmy Mak's
- The Know
- La Luna
- The Liquor Store
- No Vacancy Lounge
- Paris Theatre
- Satyricon
- Tonic Lounge
- X-Ray Cafe

== See also ==
- Culture of Portland, Oregon
- Lloyd Center music venue, under construction
- Portland's Centers for the Arts
- Steelhead (venue), under construction
