= Juneteenth in Portland, Oregon =

The federal holiday Juneteenth is celebrated annually in Portland, Oregon. A shipyard worker, Clara Peoples, is credited with spearheading the city's annual celebration in 1972. In 2025, Brianna Wheeler of Willamette Week wrote, "Peoples emigrated from Muskogee, Okla., to Vanport, Ore., in 1945 to work at the Kaiser shipyards. Upon settling into her new working community, she was surprised to learn that Juneteenth was neither known nor celebrated among Black Northwest residents. She swiftly introduced the holiday to her co-workers. Peoples not only initiated Portland's first Juneteenth celebrations, she also helped establish the city's annual Juneteenth celebration in 1972."

Mayor Ted Wheeler formally recognized Juneteenth as a paid holiday in 2020. The holiday impacts local services; for example, in 2020 and 2024, city offices were closed, and the Portland Bureau of Transportation did not enforce restrictions on street parking. Branches of Multnomah County Library have closed and the WES Commuter Rail has paused operations for the holiday.

== Events and activities ==
Among the annual events are the Juneteenth Oregon festival, the Black Liberation Ride for Black and Brown cyclists, the "History of Black Drag in Portland" event celebrating Black drag artists, and the 8 Seconds Rodeo. The Juneteenth 5K Run on the Bluff is organized annually in North Portland by the Big Yard Foundation. The run benefits the organization and its Big Yard Academy. In addition to the usual 5K run, the 2025 event had a fun run for children.

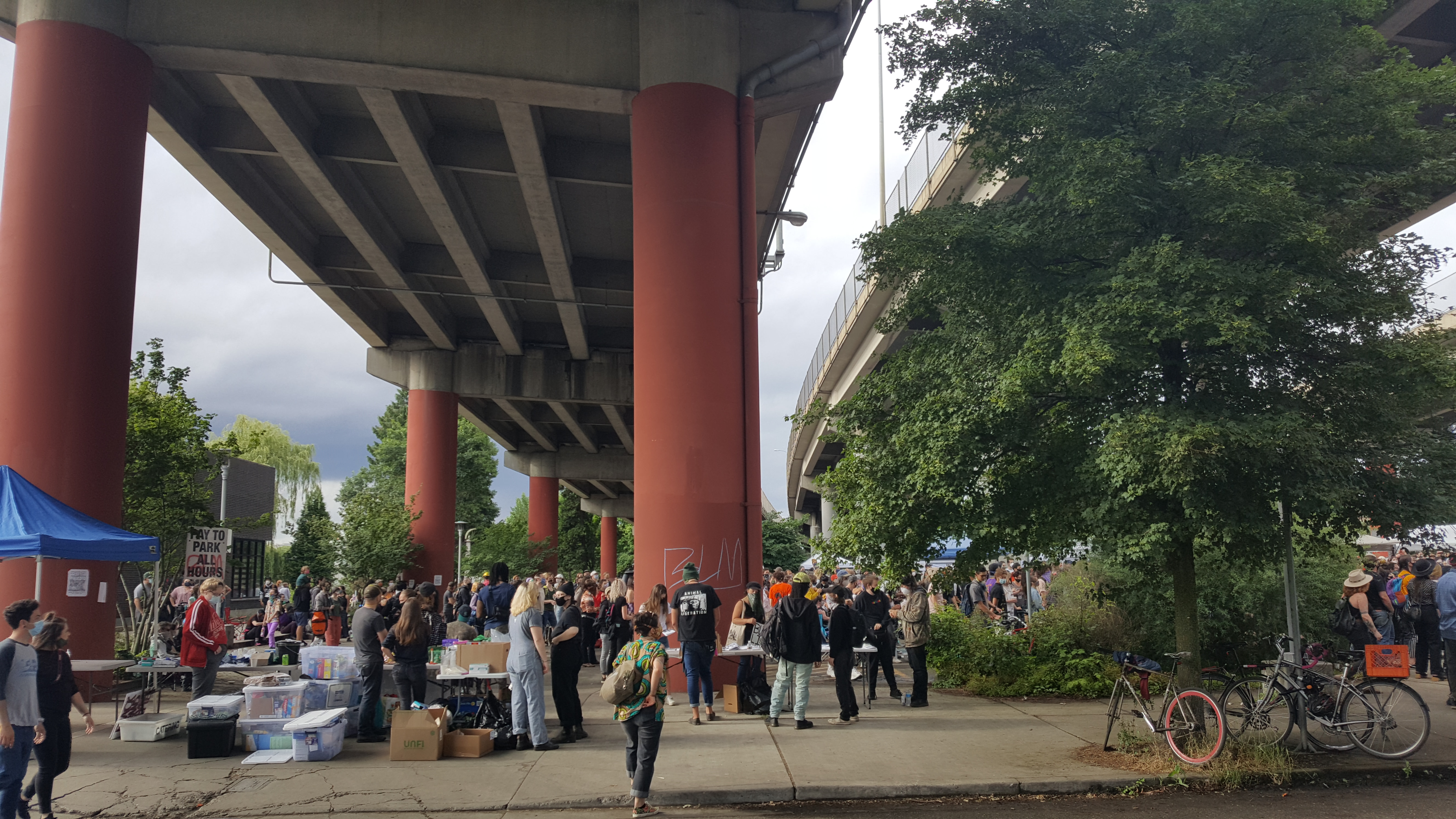
Black Lives Matter event for Juneteenth, Portland, Oregon, 2020

In 2020, during the COVID-19 pandemic, thousands of people participated in a march that shut down the Interstate Bridge to traffic from Washington for an hour. Other activities included a virtual "#BlackLikeMe Census" celebration hosted by We Count Oregon, a Black Futures Rally organized by Snack Bloc PDX that included a march from the Salmon Street Springs at Tom McCall Waterfront Park to Terry Schrunk Plaza, and a community art event and children's march in northeast Portland organized by Don't Shoot Portland. The Talented X hosted a celebration and march at St. Johns Plaza and a jamboree at McCoy Park. In 2021, the Big Yard Foundation hosted a "Celebration of Black Lives" with a march from Peninsula Park to King Elementary School. The event had food and entertainment, raffle prizes, and a COVID-19 vaccination site.

Among Juneteenth activities in 2022 was the Juneteenth Makers Marketplace in southeast Portland hosted by the Black- and woman-owned Vend Again Marketplace. The Freadom Festival, the city's first Black book festival, was held at Peninsula Park. Vanport Mosaic hosted the "Juneteenth Power to the People: Black Panther Party Legacy Tour of Albina", a walking tour focused on the Black Panther Party. The Wattles Boys and Girls Club held a community health fair for Juneteenth and Father's Day. Activities in 2023 included the Freadom Festival and the "Celebrating Nostalgia" concert organized by SoundTruck NW in collaboration with MusicPortland and the World Arts Foundation. The Oregonian said the concert "focused on the Black female voice" and featured Lo Steele and the duo Faith and Majesty.

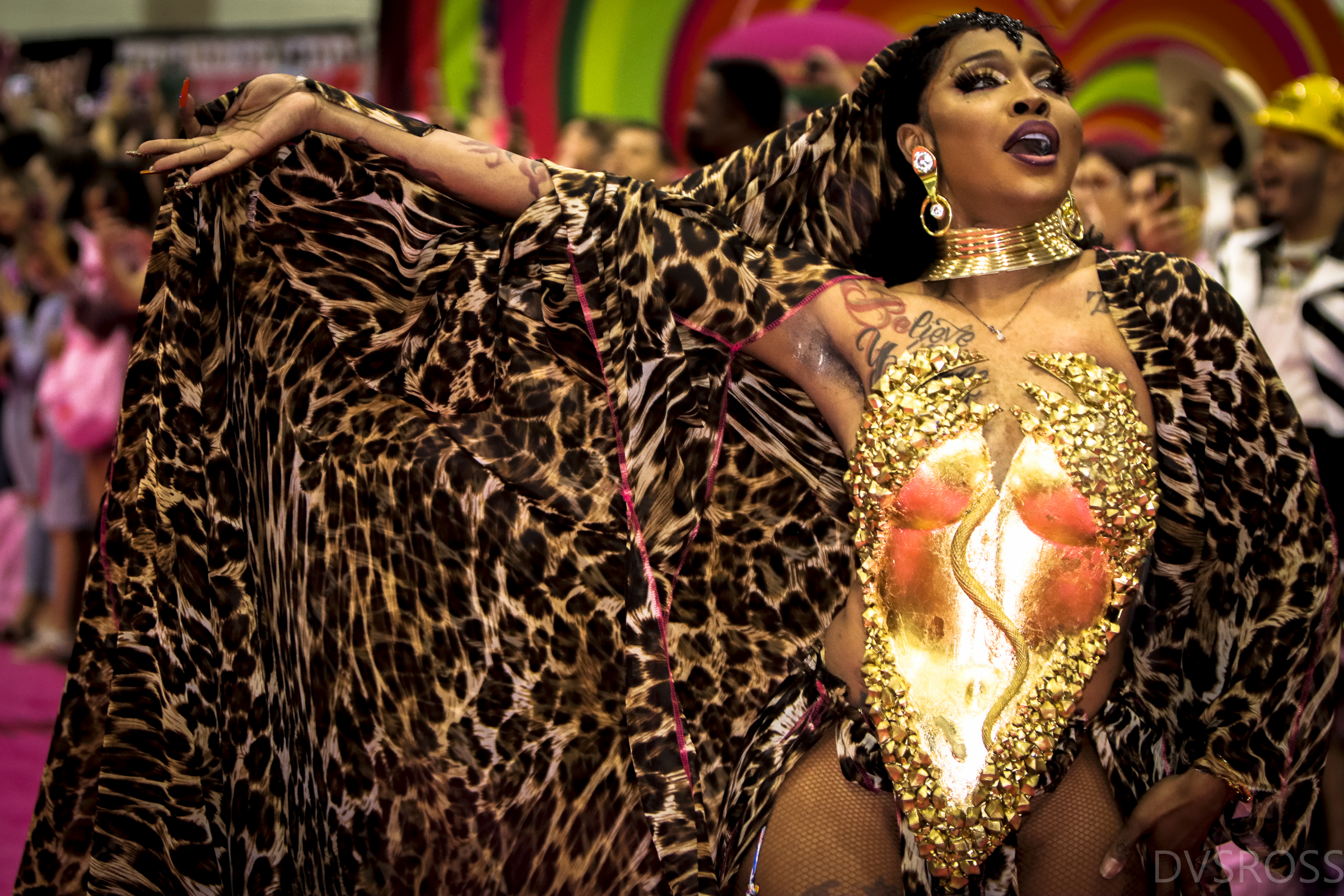
The 2024 event "Black to Drag Dance" was hosted by drag performer A'keria C. Davenport (pictured at RuPaul's DragCon LA in 2022).

Various activities were held in 2024, including the "Black to Drag Dance" at The Get Down in southeast Portland, which was hosted by drag performer A'keria C. Davenport and other Black drag queens. Multnomah County's REACH program and the ACHIEVE coalition hosted "Reclaiming Black Joy" at Vance Park. The event had food, music, and performances. The Portland Juneteenth Market was held at the Cart Blocks and highlighted local Black-owned businesses. The Black Parent Initiative's second annual Black Joy Brunch was a fundraiser and ceremony at the Multnomah Hotel.

In addition to the Run on the Bluff, several other events were organized in 2025. Don't Shoot Portland's The Black Gallery hosted a cookout with soul food from Kee's Loaded Kitchen. Organizers offered free art supplies and books to those in attendance. The bar Barrel Room hosted the People's Poets Juneteenth Showcase and Open Mic. The Bloom Agency hosted "an immersive fashion experience showcasing visionary BIPOC designers" at the Melody Ballroom. In Hillsdale, the Hillsdale Library hosted a week with various activities such as pot painting and planting, open mics for poetry, storytelling, and a Black superheroes craft fair. The Micro Enterprise Services of Oregon hosted the third annual Maker Market as a Juneteenth celebration. The Portland Art Museum's "Power of Place Juneteenth" event at Tomorrow Theater included two short film screenings and a panel discussion. The Miracles Club, a recovery center for the local Black community, hosted a Juneteenth celebration with a barbecue, guest speakers, live music, vendors, and activities for children.

Some sites have offered free admission on Juneteenth, including the Leach Botanical Garden and the Portland Art Museum. Some local businesses have offered specials and hosted fundraisers; in 2020, Powell's Books donated 30 percent of sales to Don't Shoot Portland and other organizations, and Voodoo Doughnut sold Juneteenth Sprinkle Cakes with proceeds benefiting the Jack and Jill Foundation.

=== Juneteenth Oregon ===
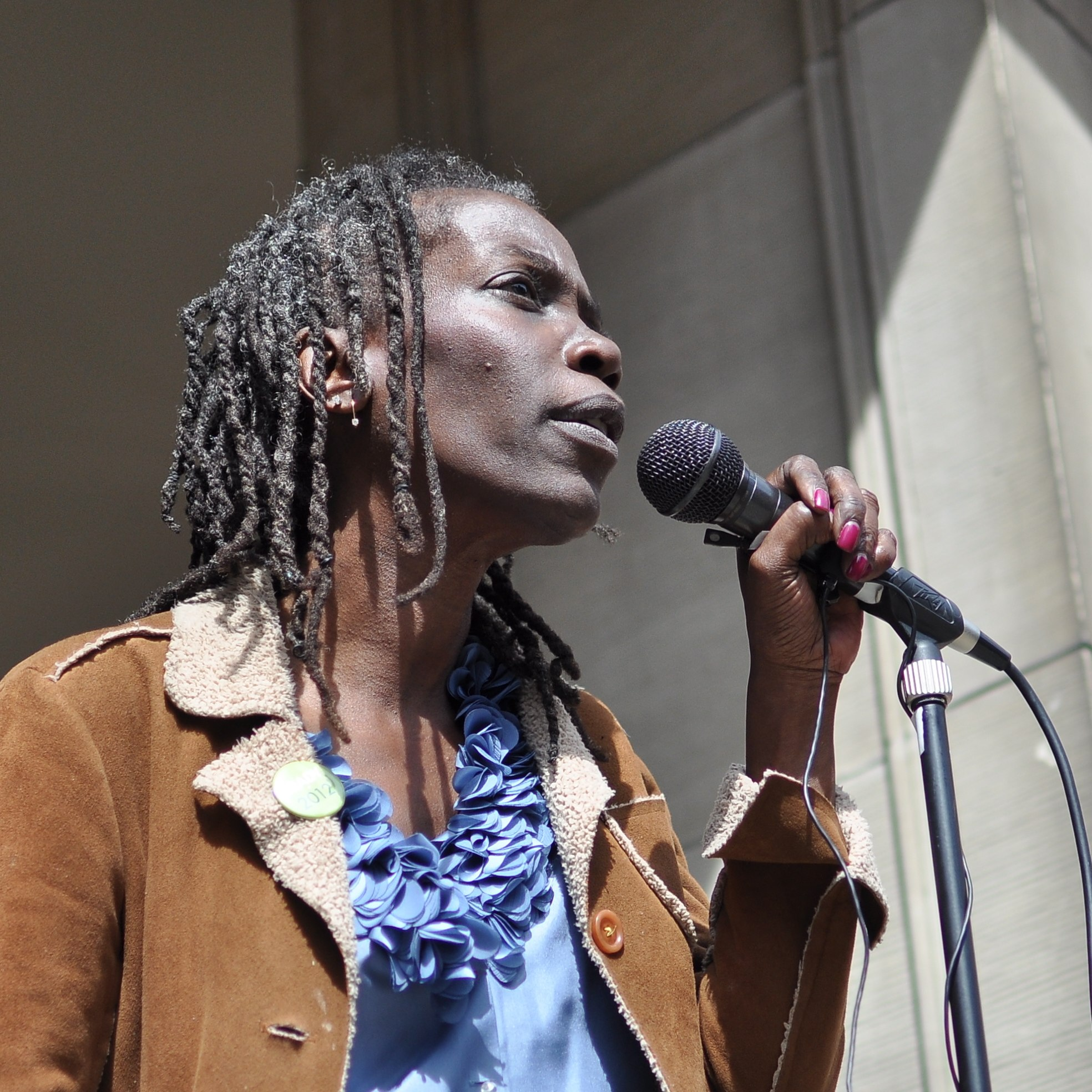
Commissioner Jo Ann Hardesty (pictured in 2012) was a guest during the virtual Oregon Juneteenth celebration in 2020.

The annual Oregon Juneteenth festival was founded by Clara Peoples. The festival has included a parade since 2016. In 2023, Rosemarie Stein of The Oregonian described Juneteenth Oregon as Portland's largest Juneteenth event and "a signature event" of the Portland Rose Festival.

In 2020, during the pandemic, the event was held online and featured Commissioner Jo Ann Hardesty. In 2021, Juneteenth Oregon was also held virtually and featured performances and appearances by Governor Kate Brown and Senator Jeff Merkley. In 2022, Chief Sara Boone of Portland Fire & Rescue was the grand marshal of the parade, and festival performers included singer Tahirah Memory and saxophonist Mike Phillips. Approximately 500 people participated in the parade. Pleasure headlined the 52nd festival at Lillis Albina Park in 2024.

In 2025, the Clara Peoples Freedom Trail Parade departed from Dr. Martin Luther King Jr. Elementary School and the festival had food and drink options, music, and a wine garden. Hundreds of people attended and Memory was the headliner.

=== Black Liberation Ride ===
The Black Liberation Ride is an annual community cycling event for Black and Brown people. The 2020 event was held at Irving Park in northeast Portland. In 2021, the ride was held at Laurelhurst Park in the Southeast Portland portion of the Laurelhurst neighborhood. The cycling organization Shift hosted the tenth annual ride at Irving Park in 2025.

=== "History of Black Drag in Portland" ===
External media
- Community celebrates the history of Black drag in Portland on YouTube (2024), KPTV

In 2022, the "History of Black Drag in Portland" event at the Kennedy School included a panel and performances by Alexis Campbell Starr, Coco Jem Holiday, and other drag artists. The 2023 event at the same venue also had a panel focused "on the role of drag and specifically of Black performers in the Portland entertainment scene since the 1960s", a question-and-answer session, and performances. The local organization Race Talks hosted the 2024 event, as well as the fourth annual event at the Kennedy School in 2025. The event "highlight[ed] the intersection between Black culture and LGBTQ+ culture" and included drag performances and a panel co-hosted by Isaiah Esquire and Lawanda Jackson.

=== 8 Seconds Rodeo ===
The 8 Seconds Rodeo (sometimes referred to as the "Juneteenth Rodeo") is an annual Black rodeo founded in 2023. The inaugural event was the city's first ever Black rodeo. Approximately 2,500 and 7,200 people attended the 2023 and 2024 events at the Portland Expo Center and Veterans Memorial Coliseum, respectively. Forty athletes competed in 2023 and 2024. Approximately 8,000 people were expected to attend the 2025 event at Veterans Memorial Coliseum. Activities have included barrel racing, bull riding, and roping lessons.

== See also ==
- Culture of Portland, Oregon
- Juneteenth in Oregon
