= The Cotton Club =

The Cotton Club may refer to:

- Cotton Club, a famous nightclub in New York City
- Cotton Club (Portland, Oregon), a now-defunct club
- The Cotton Club (film), a 1984 film centered on the New York club
  - The Cotton Club (soundtrack)

== See also ==
- Cotton Club (disambiguation)
