= Vanport Jazz Festival =

Annual event in Portland, Oregon, U.S.

- Status: Active
- Location: Portland, Oregon
- Country: United States
- Website: vanportjazzfestival.com

The Vanport Jazz Festival is an annual jazz festival in Portland, Oregon, United States. The ninth annual event, originally slated to be held at the University of Portland in August 2026, has been cancelled. James Taylor is the festival's founder and executive producer.

The 2018 performance line-up included Norman Brown, Jonathan Butler, and Najee. Sheila E., Gerald Albright, Tahirah Memory, and Marion Meadows were part of the 2022 performance line-up. Performers in 2024 included Esperanza Spalding, Najee, and Patrice Rushen. Performers in 2025 included AverySunshine and Norman Brown.

== See also ==
- Culture of Portland, Oregon
- Jazz in Portland, Oregon
- List of festivals in the United States
  - List of music festivals in the United States
- List of jazz festivals
