= Gladys McCoy =

American politician (1928–1993)

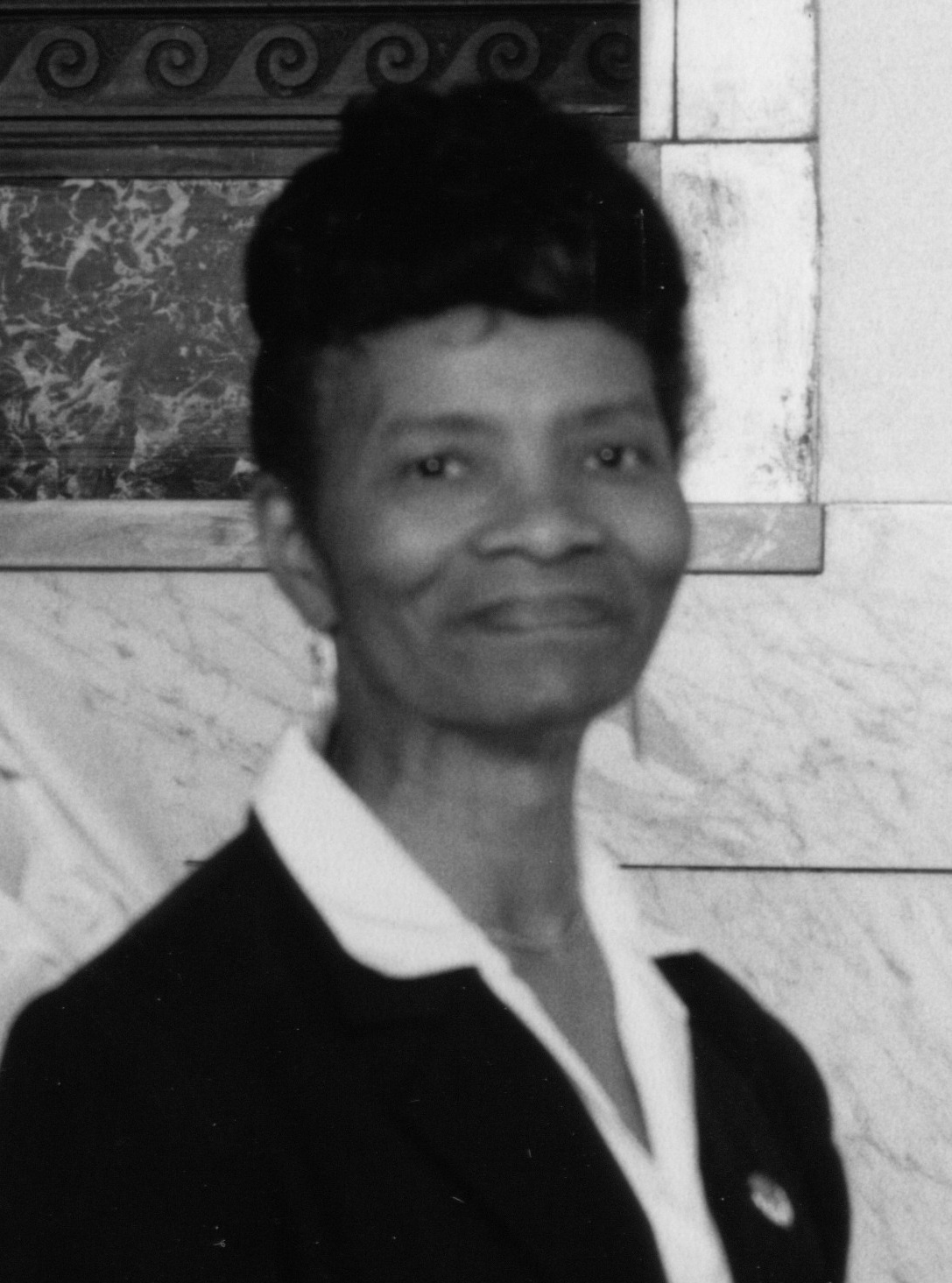

Multnomah County Chair
- In office January 1987 – April 11, 1993
- Preceded by: Pauline Anderson
- Succeeded by: Hank Miggins

Multnomah County Commissioner
- In office 1979–1984
- Preceded by: Barbara Roberts
- Succeeded by: Earl Blumenauer

Portland Public Schools Board Member
- In office 1970–1978

Personal details
- Born: February 28, 1928 Atlanta, Georgia, United States
- Died: April 11, 1993 (aged 65) Portland, Oregon, United States
- Party: Democratic
- Spouse: William "Bill" McCoy
- Children: 7
- Education: Talladega College; Portland State University

Gladys McCoy (February 28, 1928 – April 11, 1993) was an American politician who was the first African American elected to public office in the state of Oregon.

== Biography ==
McCoy was born in 1928 in Chattanooga, Tennessee. She graduated from Talladega College in Talladega, Alabama, with a bachelor's degree in sociobiology. In 1967, she graduated with a master's degree in social work from Portland State University.

McCoy was elected to the board of the Portland Public Schools in 1970, becoming the first black person elected to public office in Oregon, and serving until 1978. Her husband Bill was elected to the Oregon House of Representatives in 1972. McCoy was elected to the Multnomah County Board of Commissioners in 1978, resigning in 1984 to unsuccessfully run for the Portland City Council. She successfully ran for county chair in 1986, serving until her death from thyroid cancer on April 11, 1993.

The McCoys had seven children.

== Legacy ==
McCoy Park in Portland is named for Bill and Gladys McCoy. The Dream, a sculpture of Martin Luther King Jr. in Portland, is dedicated to them as well.

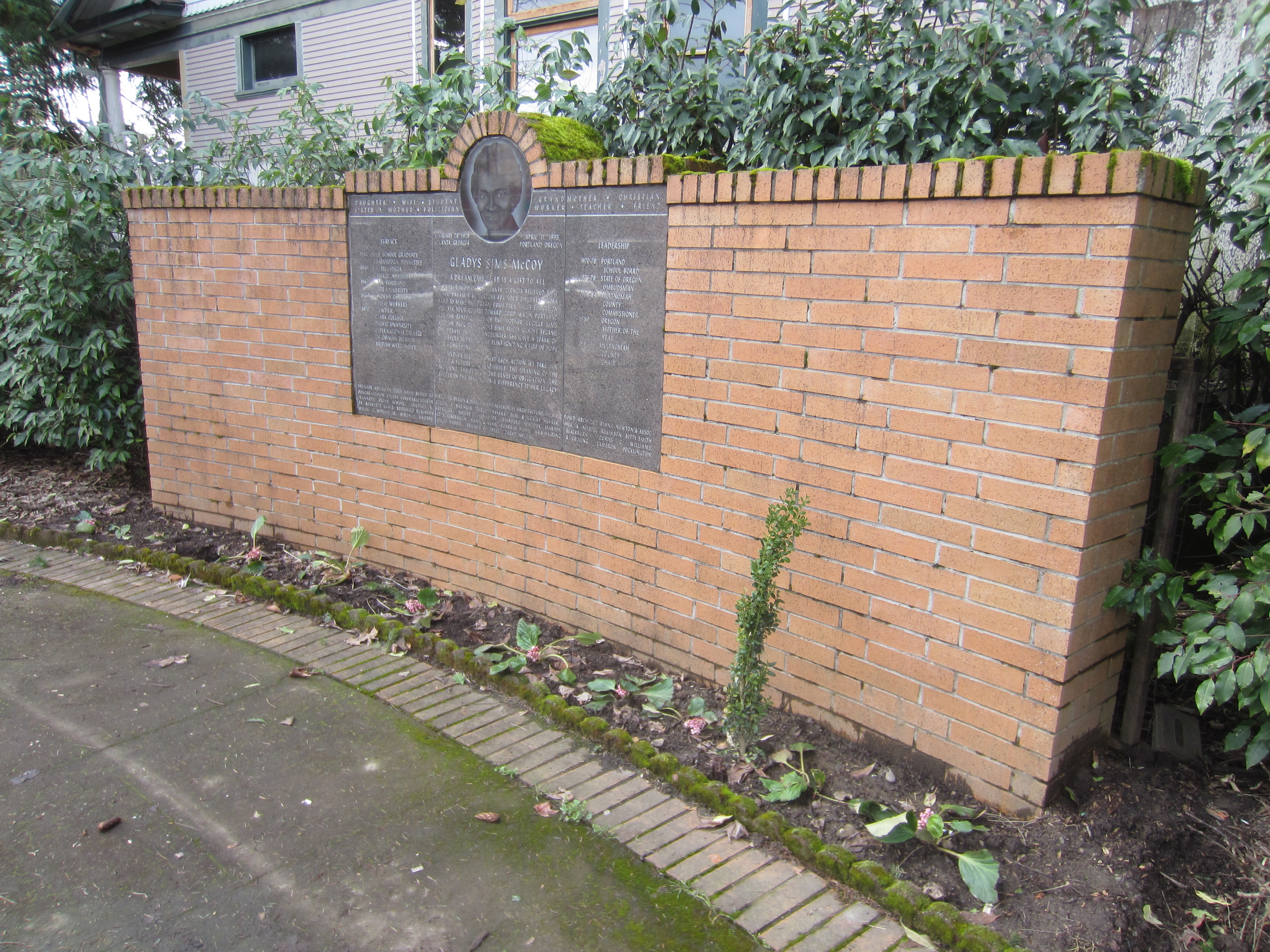
Gladys McCoy Memorial in Portland, Oregon

The Gladys McCoy Award was established in 1994. The award is given to an individual who has exemplified the life of the late Multnomah County Chair Gladys McCoy by making major contributions to civil rights, human rights, affirmative action, children and youth, family issues, community, neighborhood, local political party, local government, environmental issues, and/or education. The McCoy Award is presented annually by the Multnomah County Community Involvement Committee to somebody with outstanding lifetime volunteer service dedicated to improving the county community. Winners' names appear on permanent public display in the Multnomah County Boardroom.

In 2019, Multnomah County relocated its health department to a new building named after McCoy.
