= Steelhead (disambiguation) =

Steelhead may refer to:

- Rainbow trout, fish also known as steelhead trout
- Steelhead trout

== Places ==
- Steelhead (venue), proposed in Portland, Oregon
- Steelhead Beach Regional Park, in California
- Steelhead Provincial Park, in British Columbia
- Steelhead, British Columbia

== People ==
- Albert Steelhead (b 1858), native of Sweden, became a pioneer photographer in Chewelah, Washington

== Sport ==
- Brampton Steelheads, Canadian junior hockey team
- Gary Steelheads, American former professional basketball team
- Idaho Steelheads, American minor league hockey team
- Idaho Jr. Steelheads, American minor league hockey team
- Seattle Steelheads, American former Negro league baseball team
- Solano Steelheads, American former minor league baseball team

== Other uses ==
- USS Steelhead, an American submarine
- Nexus Q, an Android media streaming device codenamed Steelhead
- Steelhead, a WAN appliance from Riverbed Technology
