= Thara Memory =

Educator and trumpetor (1940s–2017)

Background information
- Born: 1948/1949
- Died: June 17, 2017 (aged 68)
- Genres: Jazz
- Occupations: Educator, trumpeter
- Instrument: Trumpet

Thara Memory was a trumpeter and educator. He lived in Portland, Oregon, United States.

== Biography ==
In 2005, he founded the American Music Program Pacific Crest Jazz Orchestra (often shortened to American Music Program), a youth jazz orchestra in Portland, Oregon, that has won national accolades. During the 2012 Portland Jazz Festival, Memory was honored as 2012's Portland Jazz Master.

On February 10, 2013, Memory won a Grammy Award in the Best Instrumental Arrangement Accompanying Vocalist(s) category for his arrangement for the Esperanza Spalding track "City of Roses" from her album Radio Music Society, which featured the students of the American Music Program in the music video and backing up Spalding on the album.

On May 9, 2014, Berklee College of Music awarded Memory an honorary doctorate of music degree. Memory's message to the students was direct and sharp, a piece of wisdom from a seasoned educator. "You can't keep it unless you give it away. Start giving it away as soon as you walk out this door. Rehearsal every day is the answer. If you rehearse every day, you have nothing to worry about."

On May 9, 2015, the American Music Program, which Memory still directed at the end of his life despite his failing health, won Jazz at Lincoln Center's Essentially Ellington high school jazz band competition, playing Ellington's "Tattooed Bride" from memory.

At the time of his death he had been under arrest, after being charged with eight counts of sexual abuse and assault.

Memory died on June 17, 2017, at the age of 68.
