= Cotton Club (disambiguation) =

The Cotton Club was a night club in New York City in the 1920s and 1930s.

Cotton Club may also refer to:

- Cotton Club (Portland, Oregon), a club in Portland, Oregon, U.S.
- Cotton Club (Las Vegas), a club in Las Vegas, Nevada, U.S.
- The Cotton Club (film), a 1984 film that contains a fictionalized version of events from the New York City Cotton Club
- Cotton Club Casino on the former SS Nantucket (1957) in Mississippi, U.S.
- Frank Sebastian's Cotton Club, a jazz club in Culver City, California
