= Juneteenth in Oregon =

Celebration of the end of slavery in the United States

Juneteenth, a celebration of emancipation from slavery, was introduced to Oregon in 1945 by Kaiser Shipyard worker Clara Peoples, was recognized by the city of Portland in 1972, statewide in 2013, and federally in 2021.

== Timeline ==
Peoples helped make Juneteenth recognized by the City of Portland in 1972. Mayor Sam Adams and Amanda Fritz declared Peoples the "Mother of Juneteenth" in 2011. Juneteenth became an observed holiday for the City of Portland and Multnomah County employees in 2020, as part of a resolution to address structural racism.

Peoples and first Black Oregonian Senator Avel Gordly led an effort to make Juneteenth a statewide holiday in 2001. The resolution passed.

Multnomah County first recognized Juneteenth in 2018, sponsored by County Commissioner Loretta Smith. That event celebrated and heard from Senator Gordly.

== Clara Peoples ==
Clara Peoples (Née Clara Mae Walker) was born in Muskogee, Oklahoma on 8 September 1926. She moved to Vanport, Oregon in 1945, working for Kaiser Shipyards during the World War 2 shipbuilding efforts, where she started a Juneteenth event in 1945. Her family was flooded and displaced in the 1948 Vanport floods. Moving to 1406 NE Ainsworth with her husband Haley Peoples Sr. in the redlined area of Northeast Portland, she then organized efforts to feed people, which turned into the Community Care Association in 1969. By the following year the association was operating out of 2022 NE Alberta Street, rent-free from the anonymous building owner. The Alberta Street location was previously the Red and White store, seen in a 1931 photo, and was later the Don Pancho Taqueria and Market from 2000 to 2016.

Later, Peoples and Arlene Grice became the first two Black elevator operators at Joseph Shemanski's Eastern Department Store. She was also the first Black person on the State Board of Agriculture. She was also a hall monitor at Adams High School.

In 2011 and 2013, Oregon politician Lew Frederick introduced bills to recognize Peoples. It was enrolled and signed by the governor on May 1, 2013.

Peoples died on October 5, 2015, at age 89. The annual parade was named the "Clara Peoples Freedom Trail Parade" beginning in 2016.

By 2020, Peoples' granddaughter, Jenelle Jack, was the director of Juneteenth Oregon.

== See also ==
- Juneteenth in Portland, Oregon
