= Mel Brown (drummer) =

American jazz drummer (born 1944)

- Born: July 25, 1944 (age 82); Portland, Oregon, U.S.
- Education: Portland State University
- Occupations: Musician, drummer
- Years active: 1967–present

Mel Brown (born 25 July 1944) is an American jazz drummer, and one of the most prominent jazz musicians in Portland, Oregon, United States.

== Early life ==
Brown was born in Portland, Oregon in 1944. He had a paper route delivering papers through what is known as Portland's Jazz district. In high school Brown was very involved with the Portland Junior Symphony while attending Portland State University. While at the university, he invested his time playing at local Jazz Clubs and played/recorded with a group called "Billy Larkin & The Delegates" on Aura/World Pacific/Liberty Records.

Brown graduated from Portland State University and moved to Vancouver, BC where he got a steady gig playing with the guitarist Tommy Chong. Martha Reeves happened to be at one of his gigs and hired him in 1967 to join her band. Brown played for Reeves and the Vandellas for a couple of years (she gives him a shout out on her unreleased Live at the Copa album) before Motown hired him away as a studio musician and to travel with other Motown acts.

== Music career ==
His time with Martha Reeves led to a contract with Motown Records. After that contract, Brown recorded with some of the biggest names in the Motown industry, including Martha and the Vandellas, Stevie Wonder, The Temptations and Marvin Gaye. Back in the 1970s and 80's session drummers such as Mel were not recognized because it was not policy to print the names of session musicians. The purpose of a session musician was to record in the studio or play with the band on stage, but they weren't actually part of the band.

In 1973, Brown moved back to Portland Oregon and made it his permanent home. Six years later, Brown created a trio band with piano player George Mitchell and bass player Phil Baker.

For two years, 1978–1980, Brown toured with Diana Ross and the trio band he created. Brown owned and operated The Mel Brown Drum Shop until 1984 and then opened a bookkeeping service which he called Metropolitan Accounting and Tax. He maintained his music career playing gigs and performing different shows throughout the Portland Jazz District. Brown created the Sextet, performing every week at The Hobbit in southeast Portland. Brown had the opportunity to record and play with Leroy Vinnegar and the two of them started a Hammond B-3 organ quintet. In the 1990s, Mel was added to the board of directors for the Mt. Hood Jazz Festival and created the Mel Brown Jazz summer camp workshop located at Western Oregon University. In 1999 Brown was inducted into the Jazz Society of Oregon Hall of fame. Throughout his career he also played and performed with the Oregon Symphony.

Brown continues to live in Portland and still runs his accounting company by day. He had longstanding gigs at Portland's Jimmy Mak's, playing weekly with his Septet, Quartet, and B3 Organ Group until the club closed in 2016. He continues to play regularly with his B3 Organ Group at the Jack London Revue and with his trio at Salty's on the Columbia in Portland, Oregon.

== Discography ==
- 1988: Andrei Kitaev, Tim Gilson, Mel Brown - Yesterdays (Jazz Marc 1230) [LP release only]
- 1989: Mel Brown Sextet - Plays Music By Gordon Lee: Gordon Bleu (Gleeful GL-001)
- 1994: Jessica Williams and Leroy Vinnegar with Mel Brown - Encounters (Jazz Focus JFCD-005)
- 1996: Leroy Vinnegar with Jessica Williams and Mel Brown - The Boss of the Walking Bass: A Tribute to Leroy Vinnegar [live] (Jazz Focus JFCD-036 [rel. 2000])
- 1999: Mel Brown [B3 Organ] Quintet - Live at Jimmy Mak's (Karmenpolicy 2102)
- 2000: Mel Brown [Sextet] - Mister Groove (Karmenpolicy 21012)
- 2001: Patrick Lamb (featuring Louis Pain, Jason Carter and Mel Brown) - Sunshine Alley (Patrick Lamb Productions PLP-7453)
- 2003: Mel Brown B3 Organ Quartet - Live at the Britt Festival (Shoug Records SR-105)
- 2005: Mel Brown Quartet - Girl Talk (Saphu SCD-0021)
- 2006: Mel Brown Quartet - Live: An Evening with the MBQ (Saphu SCD-0023)
- 2006: Mel Brown Sextet - Plays the Music of Gordon Lee: Gordon Bleu (20th Anniversary Edition) (Diatic Records 004) [reissue of Gleeful material]
- 2006: Renato Caranto (featuring Gordon Lee, Andre St. James and Mel Brown) - Nice To Be Home (Diatic Records 006)
- 2006: Mel Brown B3 Organ Group - Smokin' at Jimmy's (Shoug Records SR-106)
- 2007: Jof Lee, Tim Gilson, Mel Brown - Live at Salty's (Saphu SCD-0028)
- 2014: Gordon Lee with the Mel Brown Septet - Tuesday Night (OA2/Origin 22111)
- 2014: Mel Brown B3 Organ Group - Ticket To Ride: 16th Anniversary Show, Vol. 1 (Shoug Records SR-107)
- 2014: Mel Brown B3 Organ Group - More Today Than Yesterday: 16th Anniversary Show, Vol. 2 (Shoug Records SR-108)
- 2019: King Louie Organ Trio (featuring Renato Caranto, Edwin Coleman III and Mel Brown + guests: Bruce Conte and Dan Faehnle) - It's About Time (Shoug Records SR-110)

With Billy Larkin & The Delegates

- 1964: Billy Larkin & The Delegates (Aura/World Pacific/Liberty AR-3002/ST-3002)
- 1965: Blue Lights (Aura/World Pacific/Liberty AR-83003/ARS-23003)
- 1965: Hole In The Wall (World Pacific/Liberty WP-1837/WPS-21837)
- 1968: The Best of Billy Larkin & The Delegates (World Pacific/Liberty WPS-21883)
