= American Music Program =

American non-profit youth jazz band

The American Music Program (née Pacific Crest Sinfonietta, Cultural Recreation Band) is a youth jazz band in Portland, Oregon founded by jazz trumpeter, composer, and educator Thara Memory. This non-profit youth music program mentors primary school students from 7th-12th grade. On May 9, 2015, the group won Jazz at Lincoln Center's Essentially Ellington Competition, playing Ellington's Tattooed Bride from memory.

== History ==
Under the direction of Thara Memory, Greg McKelvey, and Ronnye Harrison the Cultural Recreation Band was founded in 1983. This multicultural performing orchestra served inner city youth primarily in Portland, Oregon's Albina District. Students in the program competed in state and regional jazz band competitions.

Expanding its reach throughout Portland's metropolitan area suburbs, the non-profit 501(c)3 Pacific Crest Sinfonietta was founded by Thara Memory and LeAnn Kritz in 2005. Students in the group came from Beaverton's Arts and Communications Magnet Academy as well as Portland's Metropolitan Youth Symphony. The program has since enrolled middle school and high school students throughout the greater Portland metropolitan area.

Changing its name to American Music Program, the band has performed in competitions across the country, including the Essentially Ellington Competition at Lincoln Center, the Next Generation Jazz Festival in Monterey, the Charles Mingus Festival and Competition, Lionel Hampton Jazz Festival, Swing Central at the Savannah Music Festival, and locally at events such as the Mt. Hood Jazz Festival and the PDX Jazz Forward Competition.

American Music Program students have performed with musicians such as Obo Addy, Bennie Maupin, Chuck Redd, Curtis Salgado, Esperanza Spalding, Terell Stafford, and Randy Weston.

== Notable achievements and alumni ==
Upon high school graduation, AMP alumni have attended colleges such as The Juilliard School, Berklee College of Music, Manhattan School of Music, The New School for Jazz and Contemporary Music, USC Thornton School of Music, California Institute of the Arts, Oberlin College Conservatory, among others. Students in the band have been selected for the Jazz Band of America, The Grammy Band, and The Monterey Next Generation Jazz Band. Youth members have received scholarships to attend the Berklee College of Music's summer programming and the Vail Jazz Workshop. Students in the band have participated in the Metropolitan Youth Symphony, Portland Youth Philharmonic, PDX Jazz Project, and Alan Jones Academy of Music.

American Music Program Alumni include Esperanza Spalding, Domo Branch, Charlie Brown III, Adriana Wagner, Hailey Niswanger, Aubrey Cleland, and Patrick Lamb.
