= Lloyd Center music venue =

Music venue in Portland, Oregon, U.S.

- Interactive map of Lloyd Center music venue
- Address: Portland, Oregon; United States
- Coordinates: 45.532°N 122.656°W

A music venue is under construction at the Lloyd Center shopping mall in the Lloyd District of Portland, Oregon, United States. The two-story, 68,000-square-foot venue was proposed by AEG Presents and Monqui Presents.

== History ==
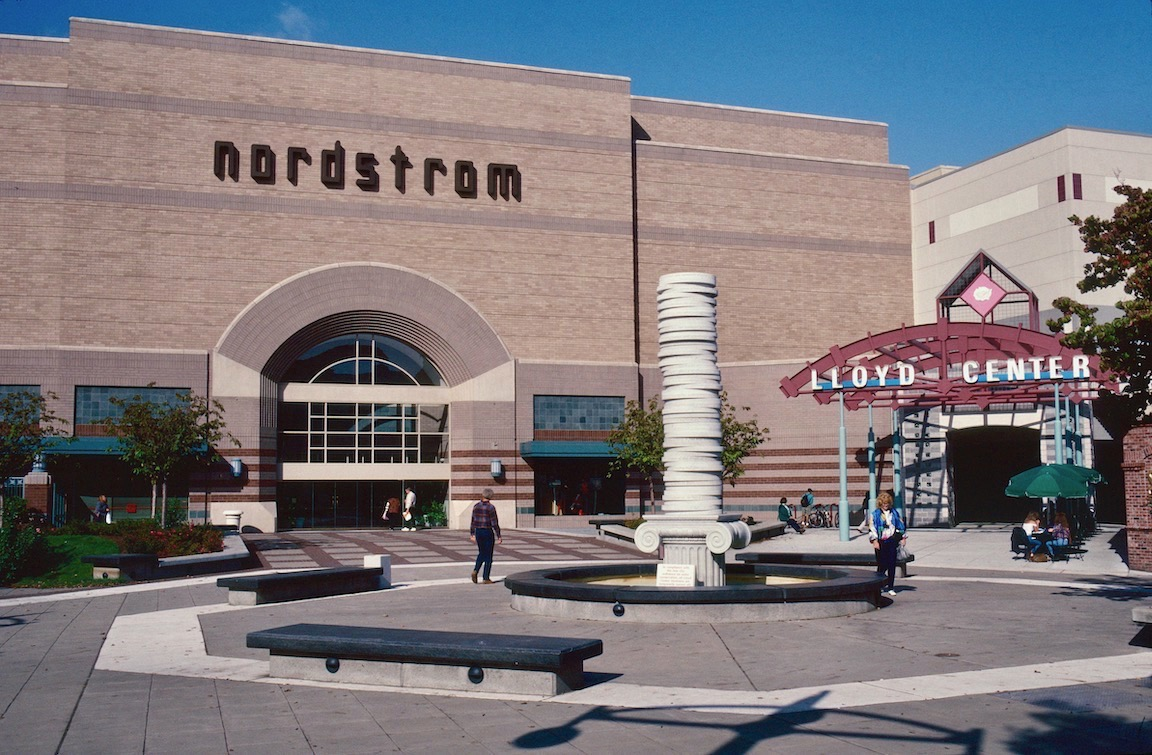
The Nordstrom store (pictured in 1992) was demolished in 2025

Demolition of the Nordstrom store occurred in mid-2025. The 4,200-seat venue is slated to open in 2027.

The cost of the project is unknown, as of May 2025. A groundbreaking was held in October 2025.

== See also ==
- Culture of Portland, Oregon
- List of music venues in Portland, Oregon
