= Paul Knauls =

American businessman

Paul Knauls was born in Huntington, Arkansas in 1931. He joined the Air Force in 1949 just 17 days after graduating from high school. Knauls worked up to three jobs at a time in order to save up enough money to fulfill his goal of owning a business. In addition to working as a typewriter repairman, he also worked as a dishwasher in a hotel and ski instructor on weekends. Knauls decided to pursue his dream of owning a nightclub in the Portland area due to the city's proximity to the skiing areas at Mt. Hood. A photo mosaic of Knauls was created for his 90th birthday honoring his life by community people who love, admire and appreciate him His 95th birthday celebration was held at Spare Room Restaurant and Lounge. Knolls is known as the "mayor of Albina" or the "honorary mayor of Northeast Portland".

Knauls owned the Cotton Club. He has been featured in an episode of a documentary series about Black Oregon entrepreneurs. Knauls supported the effort to install The Dream. A building has been named after him and his wife. The couple owned Geneva's Shear Perfection.

== See also ==
- List of people from Portland, Oregon
