= The Dude Ranch =

1940s jazz venue in Portland, Oregon

Coordinates: 45°32′5.4″N 122°40′6.2″W

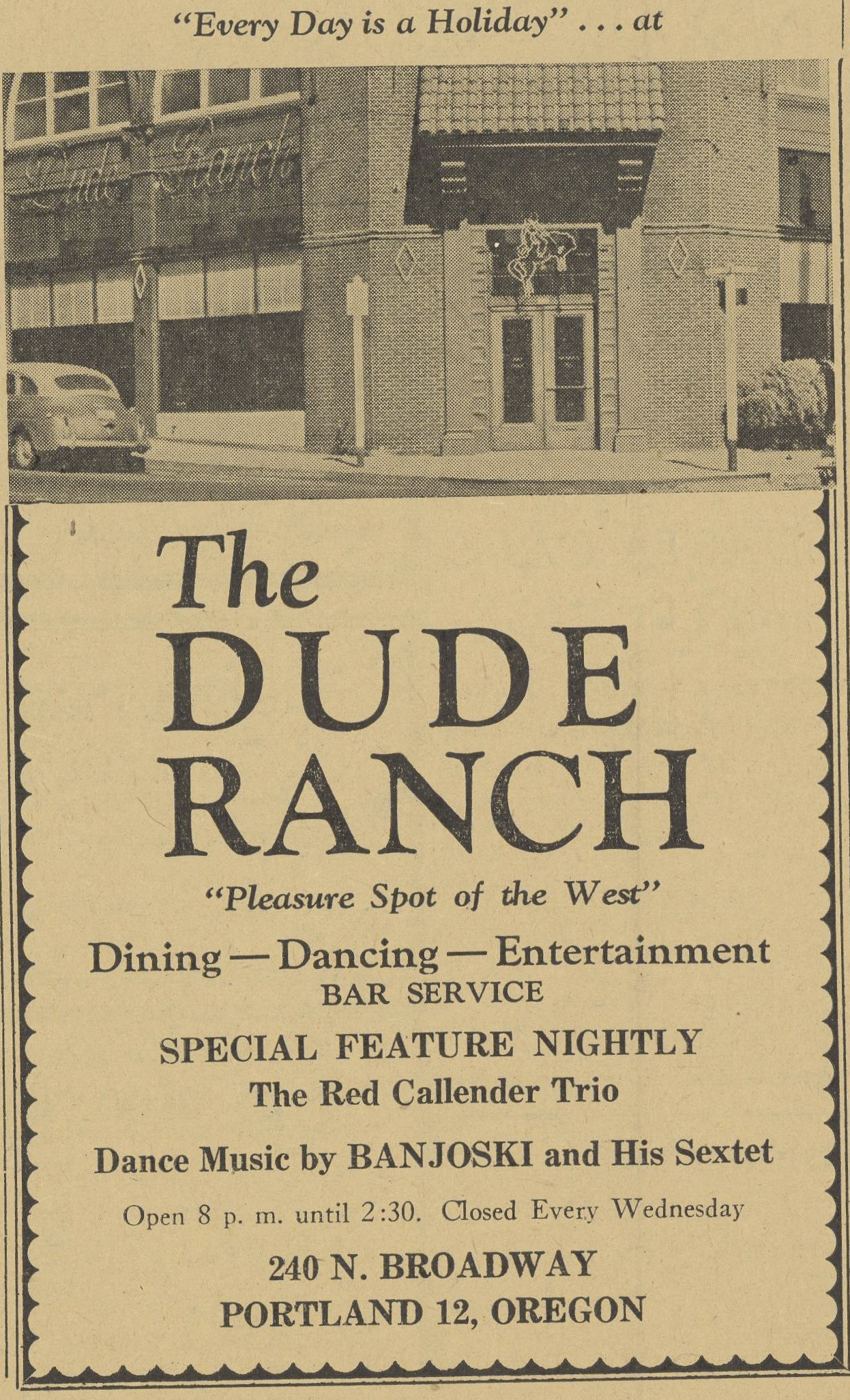
- An advertisement that appeared in The Observer, July 31, 1945.
- Type: Music venue
- Founded: early 1940s
- Defunct: 1946
- Headquarters: 240 Broadway Street, Portland, Oregon, United States of America
- Owner: Pat Patterson and Sherman "Cowboy" Pickett

The Dude Ranch was a jazz venue in Portland, Oregon that operated during World War II in the 1940s. It joined other jazz clubs along and nearby North Williams Avenue, a Black neighborhood. The venue was the self-proclaimed "Pleasure Spot of the West."

== History ==
The Dude Ranch jazz supper club opened in 1945 and was open for just one year. In that time it brought world-class jazz musicianship to the city. It was known as one of Portland's Black and Tan jazz clubs in 1945. The club was owned by Pat Patterson, the first African American basketball player at the University of Oregon, and Sherman "Cowboy" Pickett. The club's name was reflected in its decor, which included murals of black cowboys and waitresses in cowgirl outfits with holsters and cardboard pistols. The club was also known for its shaker girls, jugglers and tap dancers.

Dude Ranch owners, Pickett and Patterson, booked popular local and national musicians including Lionel Hampton, Art Tatum, Louis Armstrong, Billie Holiday, and the Nat “King” Cole trio. On December 5, 1945, Norman Granz’ touring show “Jazz at the Philharmonic” visited Portland and held an impromptu jam session at the Dude Ranch. That night, saxophonist Coleman Hawkins led trumpeter Roy “Little Jazz” Eldridge, bassist Al McKibbon, and pianist Thelonious Monk. William McClendon stated in The Observer, one of Portland's Black newspapers, “Never before in the history of the northwest has there been as much jazz music played per square minute by any group.”

The Dude Ranch was regularly covered by The Observer in a recurring section known as "Rhythm Round-Up". The Observer also regularly ran advertisements for the venue.

The 240 North Broadway location of the Dude Ranch, considered by some to be "the hottest Black and Tan supper club west of Chicago," was closed in 1946. Local papers claimed the closure was due to gambling and an accidental shooting. The Dude Ranch reopened nearby but it did not have the same level of popularity.

Some of the other African-American music or entertainment venues in the Portland metropolitan area at the time included Club Acme (1504 N. Williams Avenue, Portland), Cotton Club (215 Main Street, Vancouver, Washington), and Club Monterey (NW Third Avenue near Flanders Avenue, Portland).

== See also ==
- Culture of Portland, Oregon
