= Portland Observer =

Black newspaper published in Portland, Oregon

Coordinates: 45.557°N 122.662°W

- "Committed to Cultural Diversity"

- Type: Weekly newspaper
- Founder: Joyce Washington
- Publisher: Mark Washington
- General manager: Lucinda Baldwin
- Founded: 1970
- Language: English
- Headquarters: 4747 NE Martin Luther King Jr. Blvd; Portland, OR 97211
- Country: United States
- ISSN: 2997-3910
- OCLC number: 9286929
- Website: portlandobserver.com
- Free online archives: University of Oregon Libraries

The Portland Observer is one of the oldest African-American newspapers in Oregon. Established in 1970, it is published weekly (on Wednesdays), in Portland, Oregon. Rev. Alfred L. Henderson founded the paper in 1970, in the tradition of the People's Observer, a 1940s publication that had ceased publication in 1950. Another paper had the same title in Portland, Michigan, from 1876 into the 20th century.

== History ==
The Portland Observer was launched by William H. McClendonn in 1938, but due to the Great Depression, folded in 1939. In June 1943, McClendon revived his newspaper as the People's Observer, which ceased again in July 1950.

Decades later Rev. Alfred L. Henderson re-established the Portland Observer in November 1970. At the time he was pastor of Bethel African Methodist Episcopal Church. Six years later Henderson moved to Berkeley, California, but planned to commute back to Portland every two weeks to manage the paper.

In October 1987, Henderson named Leon L. Harris, who owned the Seattle Observer in 1962–63, was named general manager. In 1988, the Observer moved into its own building, owned by Harris. At that time the paper had about 5,000 paying subscribers and a circulation of 12,000.

After several changes in ownership, Joyce Washington purchased the Portland Observer in 1989. Her son Corey Washington, who was involved in the paper, was shot to death after a basketball game dispute at Peninsula Park in 1991. He was 27. The company's corporation was named Corey Publishing in his memory.

Upon her death in 1996, Washington's son Charles "Chuck" Washington, a Portland native and a graduate of Jefferson High School, took over as publisher until his death in December 2012. The paper was then passed on to Mark Washington. Portland politician, radio host, restaurateur, and veteran Bruce Broussard has held a leadership position at the paper. Additionally, Albert Williams has also contributed to the paper as general manager.
