= William McClendon =

American jazz musician

- Born: 1915; Atlanta, Georgia, United States
- Died: 1996 (aged 80–81); Portland, Oregon, United States
- Genres: Jazz
- Occupation(s): Journalist, educator, activist, musician
- Instrument: Piano
- Spouse: Ida Alice Edwards

William McClendon (1915–1996) was an American journalist, newspaper editor, educator, activist, jazz musician, and prominent member of Portland's civil rights community. He was born in 1915 in Atlanta, Georgia. He died at the age of 81 in 1996 in Portland, Oregon. He founded the Portland Observer, a newspaper focused on Portland's African American community before and during World War II.

== Life and education ==
He was born in 1915 in Atlanta, Georgia and was the only child of Ananais and Annie Mae McClendon. When he was 16, McClendon enrolled at Morehouse College and was mentored by W.E.B. Du Bois.

McClendon married Ida Alice Edwards, a student at Spelman College, on January 13, 1938 in Charleston, West Virginia; they eloped after knowing each other for two weeks.

== Newspaper work ==
They moved to Portland in 1938, and McClendon began publishing the Portland Observer, which was shut down after a year. In 1943, the activist group Shipyard Negro Organization for Victory (SNOV) asked him to begin publishing a newspaper again, and the Portland Observer became the People’s Observer. McClendon felt the newspaper's goal was to "fight social and economic evils detrimental to the Negro people and other minorities" The bimonthly newspaper became a key mouthpiece for the local civil rights coalition and black community. In 1945, McClendon changed the name again to The Observer, and this paper operated until 1950.

== Jazz ==
McClendon was an accomplished jazz pianist and in 1949, bought and began managing a jazz club on Williams Avenue called the Savoy, renaming it McClendon's Rhythm Room. He ran the club until the mid-1950s. McClendon's contribution to the Portland jazz scene is memorialized annually by the Bill McClendon Award for Excellence in Jazz given by the Portland Jazz Festival.

== Activism ==
He continued to be involved in civil rights activism. He taught social sciences at Reed College and Portland State University, where he helped found the Black Studies program, and was a member of the Portland NAACP, was the advisory editor of the Black Scholar Press, and was the deputy director of affirmative action under Oregon Governor Vic Atiyeh. He published Straight Ahead: Essays on the Struggles of Blacks in America in 1995.
