= Abou Karim =

Defunct restaurant in Portland, Oregon, U.S.

- Interactive map of Abou Karim

Restaurant information
- Established: 1970s
- Closed: 2008
- Food type: Lebanese; Middle Eastern
- Location: Portland, Multnomah, Oregon, United States
- Coordinates: 45.52164°N 122.67336°W

Abou Karim was a Lebanese and Middle Eastern restaurant in Portland, Oregon, United States. The business operated in southwest Portland from the mid 1970s to 2008.

== Description ==
The Lebanese and Middle Eastern restaurant Abou Karim operated on Pine Street in southwest Portland. One guide book published in 1998 described the restaurant as "relaxed, moderately priced, and roomy". Veg Out said the interior had an "elegant and refined" decor as well as woodwork and paintings of Middle Eastern symbols. The menu included an eggplant stew, Turkish coffee, baklava, and rose water-pistachio ice cream. The mezza sampler had baba ghanoush, falafel, hummus, and tabbouleh. For lunch, the restaurant served a falafel sandwich with falafel, lettuce, tomato, and tahini sauce stuffed in pita, as well as lentil soup and a fatoosh salad with romaine lettuce, cucumbers, tomatoes, grilled pita, and sumak. Abou Karim has played recorded Arabic music and served Algerian and Moroccan wines.

== History ==
Abou Karim opened in the mid 1970s. Sami Alaeddine was the owner in 1980.

The business was included in Willamette Week's first restaurant guide in 1980. In October 2001, Aliza Earnshaw of the Portland Business Journal said Abou Karim was among local Middle Eastern restaurants that saw increased attendance following the September 11 attacks.

Abou Karim was a vendor at the Bite of Oregon in 2004. Gus Haddad (or Hadad) purchased the business in 2004. Abou Karim hosted live music (especially jazz) during the 2000s. Nancy King performed at the restaurant. In 2005, the restaurant and Susan LeMaster hosted the concert "Take Back Valentine's Day".

Abou Karim closed in 2008. The space where Abou Karim operated later housed the restaurant Tangier Moroccan & Mediterranean Cuisine.

== Reception ==
In a 2000 review for The Oregonian, Grant Butler wrote: "This Lebanese den captures the flavors and textures of the Mediterranean with an appetizer combination that's ideal summertime fare. Eggplant-rich baba ghanouj and creamy hummus are perfect for sharing, although you'll be tempted to hoard the intense, lamb-filled grape leaves and tart tabbouleh salad. For $13 a person, you get a family-style spread, plus kebabs of chicken, beef or ground lamb. Don't miss the Lebanese coffee, a rich and elegant finish." In 2001, he wrote: "This cozy den has long been a dependable spot for Lebanese favorites, but quality has slipped recently. While the hummus and feather-light pitas still are resplendent, the falafel has lost its magic, now bland and undercooked. Larger plates are experiencing problems, too: Lamb skewers can be tough, and a fork-tender lamb shank doesn't have much kick. Blessedly, desserts end things sweetly, with perfect baklava and house-made pistachio ice cream. Ceremonial tableside coffee service is gracious." In 2005, another writer for the newspaper said Abou Karim "cultivates an intimate vibe in which to hear local luminaries".

In 2001, Michael Upchurch of The New York Times said the restaurant's food was "fresh, aromatic and delectable".

== See also ==
- Jazz in Portland, Oregon
- List of Lebanese restaurants
- List of Middle Eastern restaurants
