= William McCoy (Oregon politician) =

American politician

Bill McCoy

William McCoy (June 11, 1921 – April 1996), was an American politician from Oregon. In 1972, he was the first African American elected to the Oregon State Legislature. After serving one term in the Oregon House of Representatives, he was appointed to serve in the Oregon Senate. In the next election he was elected to the same seat and served until his death in 1996. His senate district covered North Portland and much of Northeast Portland. He was a Democrat.

== Early life, education, and career ==
William McCoy was born in Indianola, Mississippi on June 11, 1921. He attended high school in Missouri and attended Lincoln University for three years, studying political science. He joined the U.S. Navy in 1942 and served three years during World War II. He moved to Portland, Oregon after the war and earned a BA degree from the University of Portland in business administration and political science. He did additional public administration coursework at the University of Oregon.

One of McCoy's first actions after being elected to the Oregon legislature was to introduce House Resolution 13, ratifying the Fourteenth Amendment to the U.S. Constitution, which Oregon had never formally ratified after rescinding a previous ratification.

== Legacy ==
McCoy Park in Portland is named for Bill McCoy and his wife Gladys, who became the first black member of the Portland school board in 1970, and the first black Multnomah County commissioner in 1979.

The Dream, a sculpture of Martin Luther King Jr. in Portland, is dedicated to Bill and Gladys McCoy.
