= Rialto (Portland, Oregon) =

Billiard hall and restaurant in Portland, Oregon, U.S.

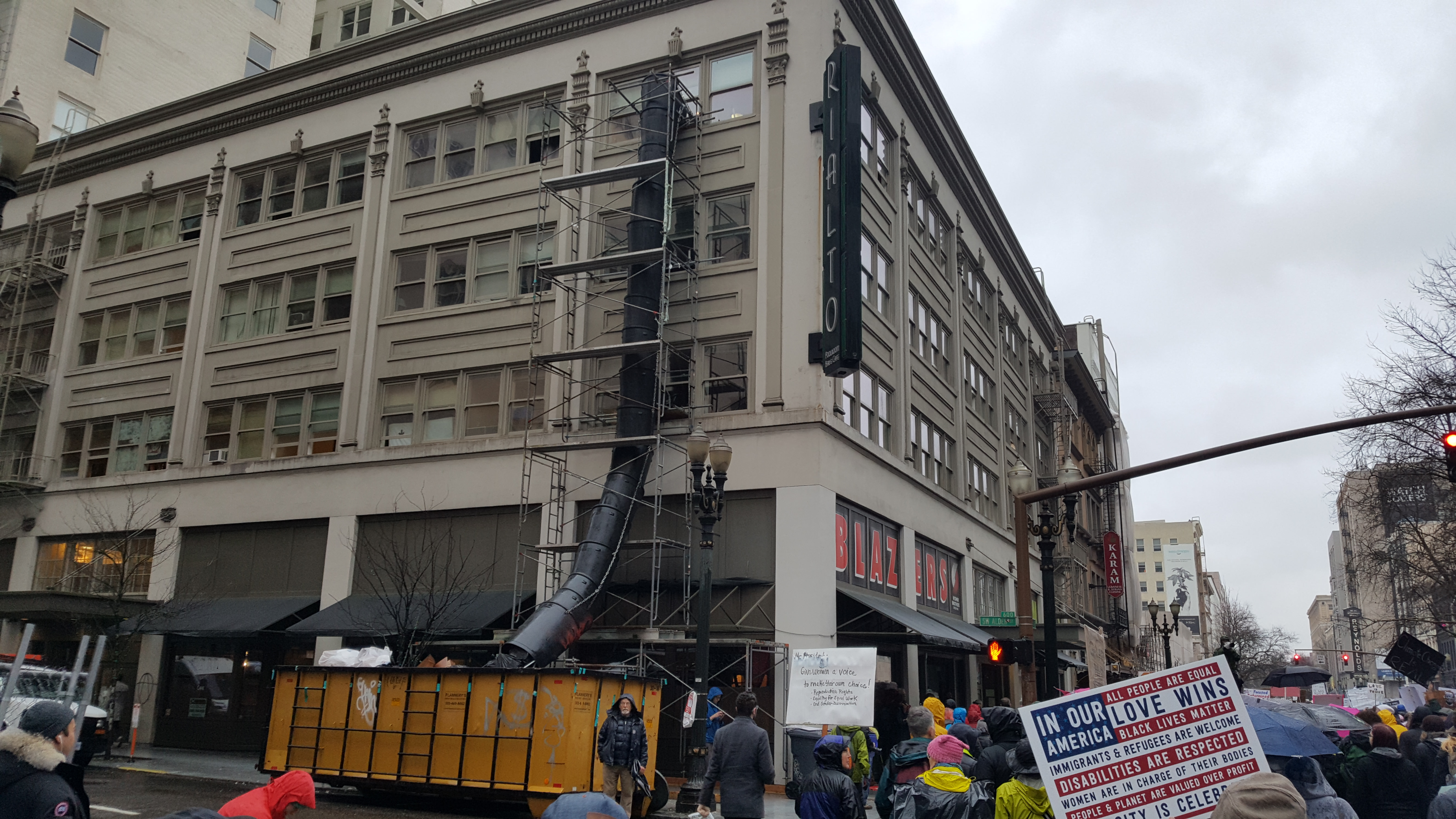
- Rialto's exterior during the Women's March on Portland, January 2017
- Interactive map of Rialto
- Address: 529 Southwest 4th Avenue
- Location: Portland, Oregon, U.S.
- Coordinates: 45°31′10″N 122°40′35″W
- Type: Billiard hall; cafe; off-track betting parlor

Construction
- Opened: 1920

Website
- Official website

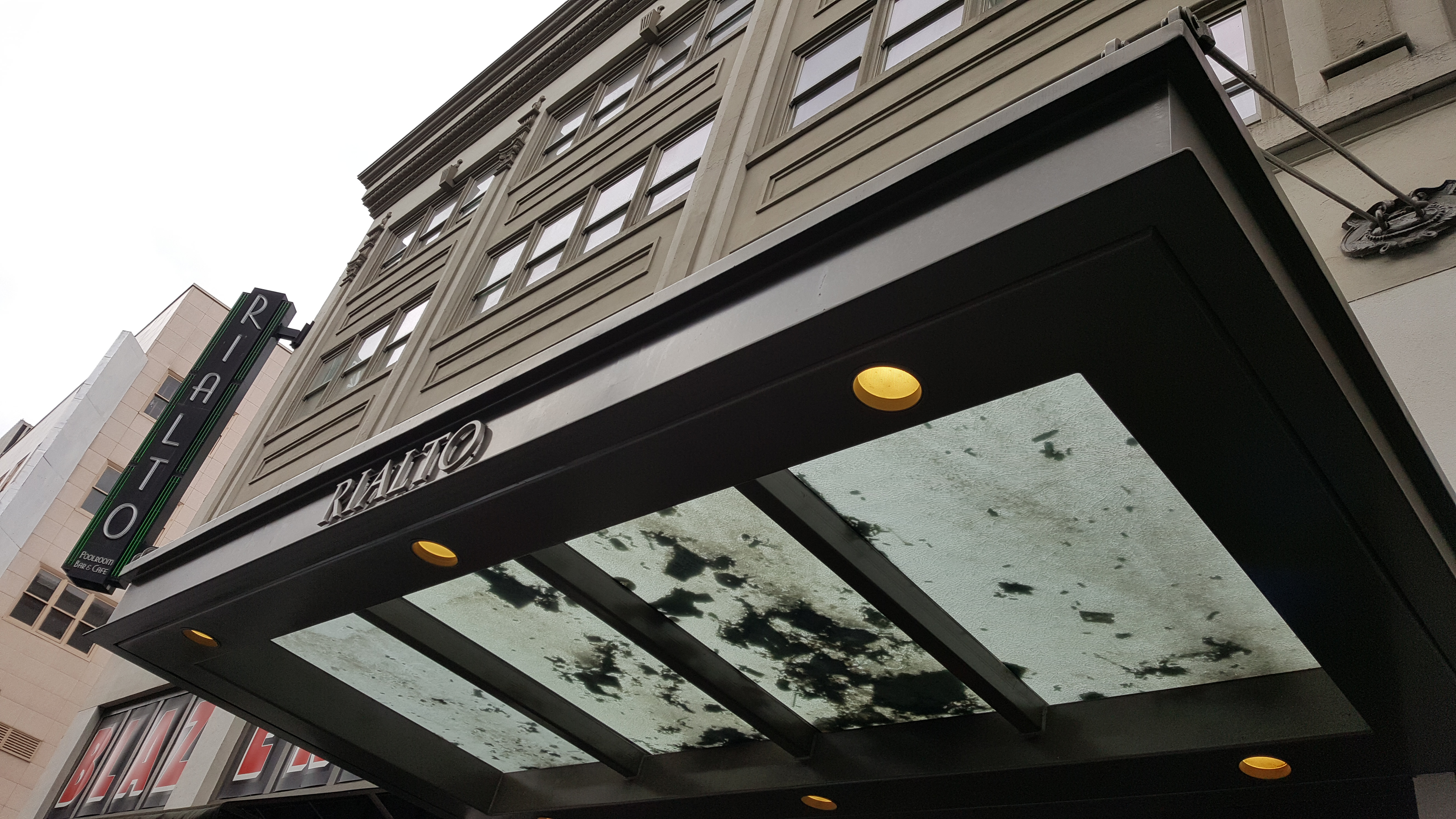
The building's exterior and signage, 2018

The Rialto Poolroom Bar and Cafe, or simply Rialto is a billiard hall, cafe, and off-track betting parlor in Portland, Oregon, in the United States. It was established in 1920.

== History ==
In September 2016, owner Arthur McFadden announced the venue's closure on December 25, and his retirement. In December, Frank Faillace and Manish Patel, who own multiple nightlife establishments in Portland, purchased Rialto and plan to keep the bar operating under the same name.

In October 2019, Rialto is named in lawsuits by American Society of Composers, Authors and Publishers for unauthorized performance of ASCAP members' copyrighted compositions at the venue in August 2019. According to the lawsuits, "ASCAP representatives have made numerous attempts to contact the Defendants" and that "Defendants have refused all of ASCAP's license offers."

== See also ==
- Jack London Revue
