= Tahirah Memory =

American singer

- Genres: Jazz and soul
- Occupations: Singer

Tahirah Memory is a jazz and soul singer. She is from Portland, Oregon and has performed internationally.

== Career ==
Memory's performances have been described as intimate experiences for the audience. Her albums include Pride (2015) and Asha (2019); Asha was nominated for several SoulTracks awards. Pride was produced by Jarrod Lawson. Memory has performed with Lawson in London and Birmingham. In 2013 Memory performed at a benefit for the American Music Program, run by her father, Thara Memory.

Memory performed at the Skanner Foundation's 35th annual Martin Luther King, Jr. breakfast in 2021 and was a headliner of the Portland Black Music Expo in fall 2021.

== Personal life ==
Memory is a single parent. Her father was famous Portland jazz trumpeter Thara Memory.
