= Jazz de Opus =

Defunct jazz club and restaurant in Portland, Oregon, U.S.

- Interactive map of Jazz de Opus
- Address: Portland, Oregon; United States
- Coordinates: 45.523716°N 122.672565°W
- Owner: Sam Pishue
- Type: Club/restaurant
- Event: Music

Construction
- Opened: 1972
- Closed: 2003

Jazz de Opus (also known as Jazz de Opus & Opus Too) was a jazz club and restaurant in Portland, Oregon, United States. It operated from 1972 to 2003. It was described as one of Old Town's first taverns and had standing gigs by local musicians. Sam Pishue was the owner.

In 2016, Grant Butler of The Oregonian said, "The restaurant side of the operation was basic seafood and steaks, with a few Cajun touches. But eating was just something to do while waiting for the music to start." Saganaki was also on the menu. A strip club later operated in the space that had housed Jazz de Opus. The jazz club has been credited for "[helping to] build Portland's lasting reputation as a vibrant, eclectic music town".

In 2010, Trisha Yearwood said of her "most memorable" meal: "When I was on tour, there was a place we went to in Portland, Oregon, called Jazz de Opus [now closed]. They played music in the front and had dinner in the back. I had one of the best steaks in my life. I like a well-done steak, but I know kitchens hate to make it. But what they did was they baked it for a while before grilling it, so it was completely done but it was tender. It was served over a mound of mashed potatoes, with blue cheese crumbled over it. Truly a well-done steak, and it was thick. It was perfection."

== See also ==
- Culture of Portland, Oregon
- Jazz in Portland, Oregon
- List of jazz venues in the United States
