= McCoy Park =

Public park in Portland, Oregon, U.S.

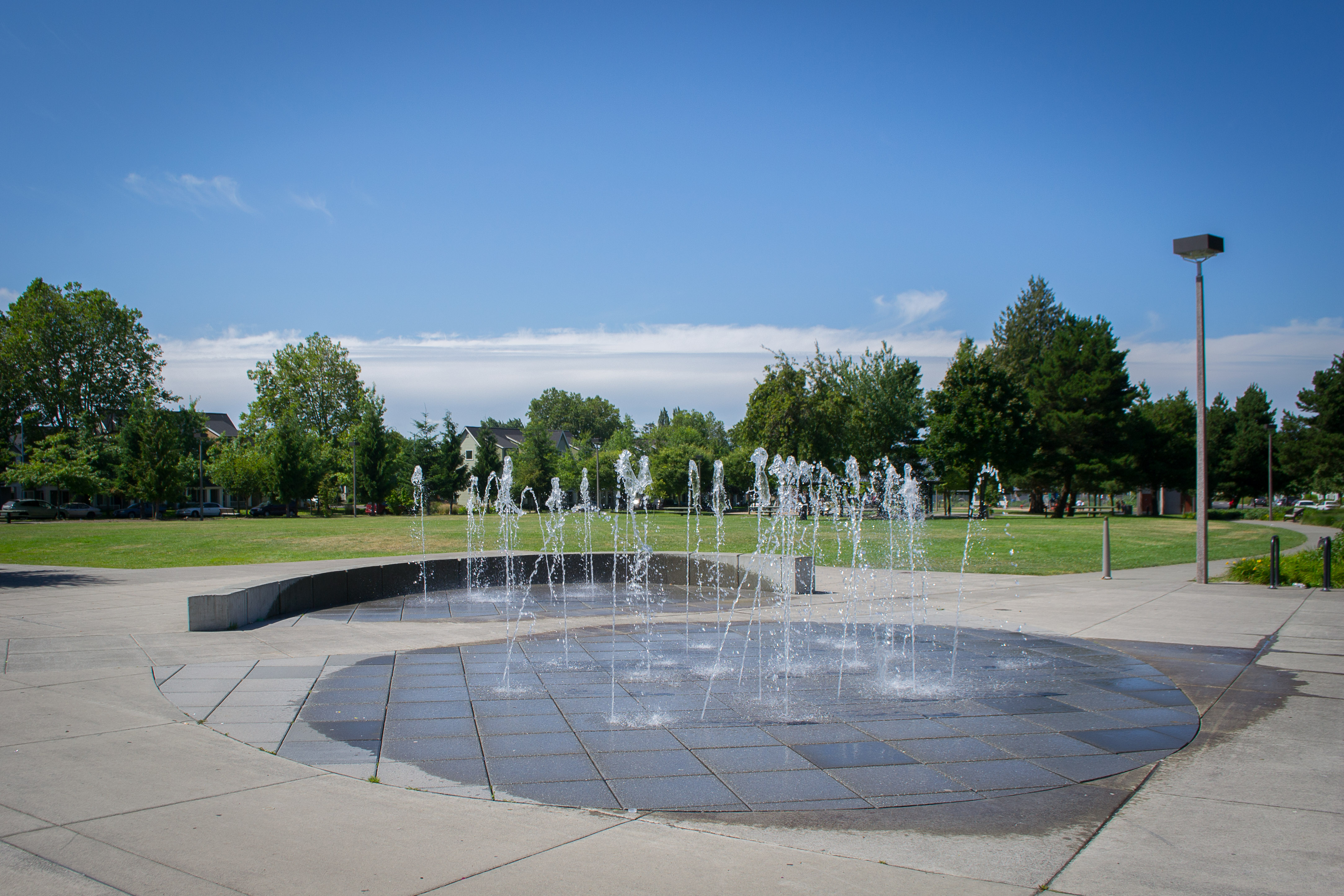
- The park's fountain in 2013
- Interactive map of McCoy Park
- Location: North Trenton Street and Newman Avenue, Portland, Oregon, U.S.
- Coordinates: 45.59°N 122.7164°W
- Area: 3.82 acres (1.55 ha)
- Operator: Portland Parks & Recreation

McCoy Park is a park in the Portsmouth neighborhood of Portland, Oregon, United States. Named for the Oregon Senator Bill McCoy and his wife Gladys, the park is located at the center of New Columbia, a large housing development in Portsmouth.

== Description and history ==
The park was acquired in 2005 and features paved paths and picnic tables, a playground, and a basketball court.

Shootings took place at or near McCoy Park in 2011, 2014, and 2016, two of them fatal.

== See also ==
- List of parks in Portland, Oregon
