= The Dream (sculpture) =

Sculpture in Portland, Oregon, U.S.

- The sculpture in 2016
- Artist: Michael Florin Dente
- Completion date: August 28, 1998
- Medium: Bronze
- Subject: Martin Luther King Jr.
- Dimensions: 8 feet (2.4 m) tall
- Location: Portland, Oregon; 45°31′48″N 122°39′43″W
- Owner: City of Portland and Multnomah County Public Art Collection courtesy of the Regional Arts & Culture Council
- Website: www.artbydente.com/The_Dream.html

The Dream, also known as the Dr. Martin Luther King Jr. Memorial Sculpture, is an outdoor bronze sculpture of Martin Luther King Jr. by Michael Florin Dente, located outside the Oregon Convention Center in Portland, Oregon. The 8-foot (2.4 m) memorial statue was dedicated on August 28, 1998, the 35th anniversary of King's "I Have a Dream" speech. It depicts King plus three allegorical sculptures: a man who symbolizes the American worker, a woman who represents immigration, and a young girl shown releasing King's coattail, who represents, according to Dente, the "letting go" that occurs when people sacrifice their time and energy to engage in a struggle. The sculpture is part of the City of Portland and Multnomah County Public Art Collection, courtesy of the Regional Arts & Culture Council.

Lee P. Brown and Vera Katz, mayors of Houston and Portland, respectively, were present at the dedication ceremony. The memorial has been used as a reference point for gatherings. It has also appeared in public art guides and walking tours. Seventy-five bronze replicas of the work exist, and Dente planned to send pieces of the original mold to each of the replicas' owners once all were sold.

== Description ==
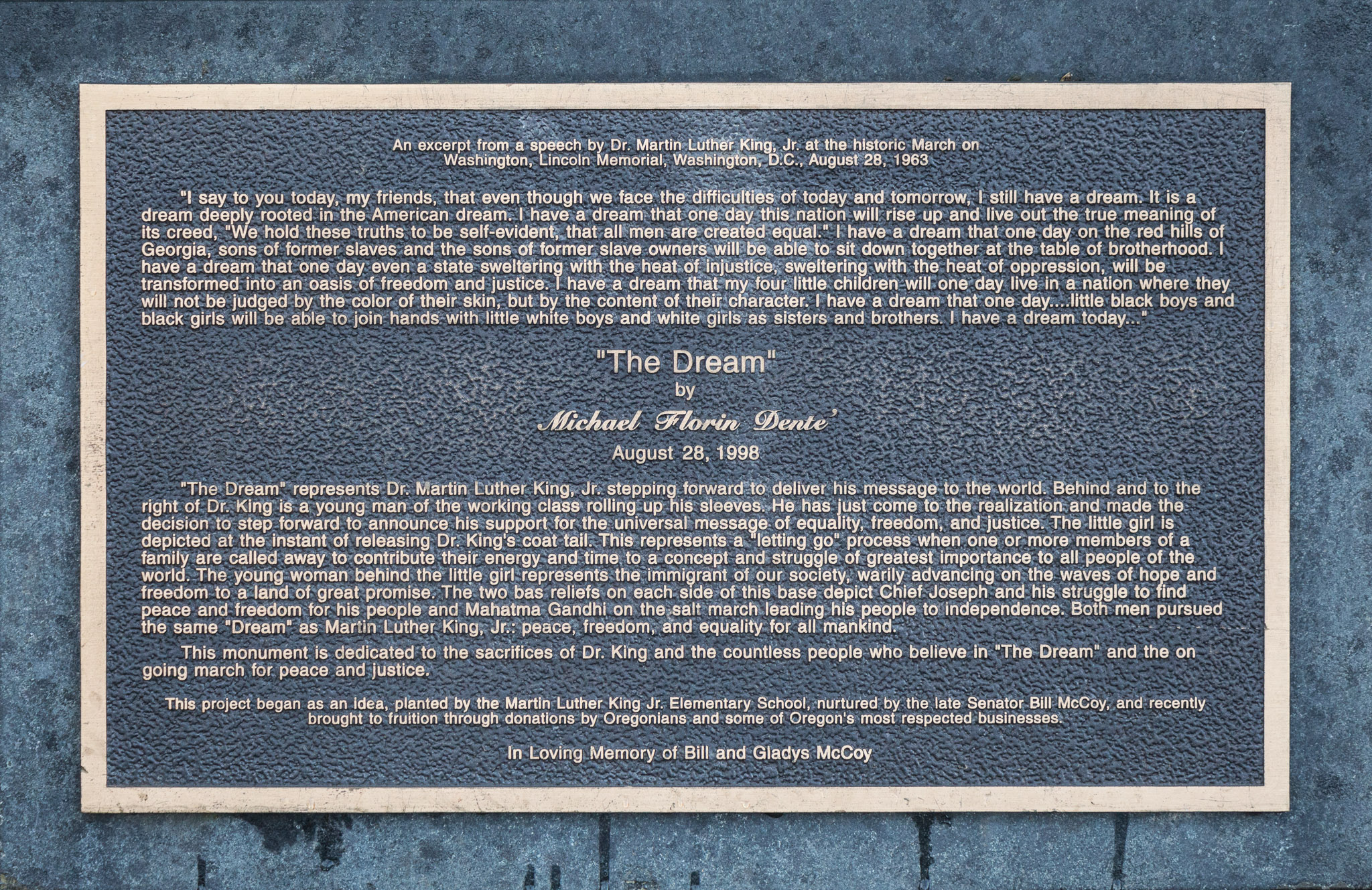
Plaque

The Dream is an 8-foot (2.4 m) bronze statue depicting Martin Luther King Jr. It is located at the intersection of Northeast Holladay Street and Martin Luther King Jr. Boulevard, outside the northeast corner of the Oregon Convention Center in the Rose Quarter of Portland's Lloyd District. King is shown "stepping forward with conviction to deliver his powerful message". He is surrounded by three allegorical figures: behind and to King's right is a young white man with his sleeves rolled up who symbolizes the working American; directly behind King is a woman wading ashore who represents the country's immigration history; and behind and to the left of King is a young girl, shown releasing King's coattail, who represents "intergenerational respect". According to Dente, the working-class man "has come to the realization and made the decision to step forward to announce his support for the universal message of equality, freedom and justice". Dente described the girl's release of King's coattail as "a 'letting go' process when one or more members of a family is called away to contribute their energy and time to a concept and struggle of greatest importance to all people of the world".

The artist dedicated the monument to King's sacrifices, to those who believe in King's message, and to the "ongoing march for truth and justice". Business and organizations that contributed $10,000 or more to the project are recognized at the statue. Funders included ARCO, Chevron Corporation, Fred Meyer, The Greenbrier Companies/Gunderson, Inc., International Art Group, Kaiser Permanente, Legacy Emanuel Medical Center, Meier & Frank, Oregon Health & Science University, Oregon Labor Unions AFL–CIO, Oregon Lottery, Portland Development Commission, Portland Trail Blazers, RH Parker/United Foundation, US West, and the William G. Gilmore Fund of the Oregon Community Foundation. The work is part of the City of Portland and Multnomah County Public Art Collection, courtesy of the Regional Arts & Culture Council.

Seventy-five bronze replicas exist; once the replicas were purchased, Dente planned to send pieces of the mold to each of the replicas' owners.

== History ==
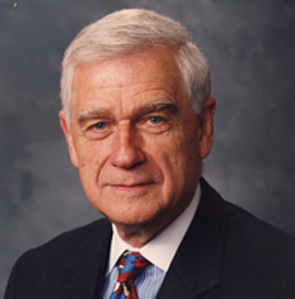
U.S. Senator Mark Hatfield spoke at a fundraising breakfast for the sculpture.

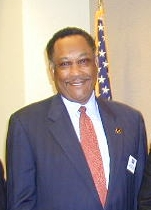
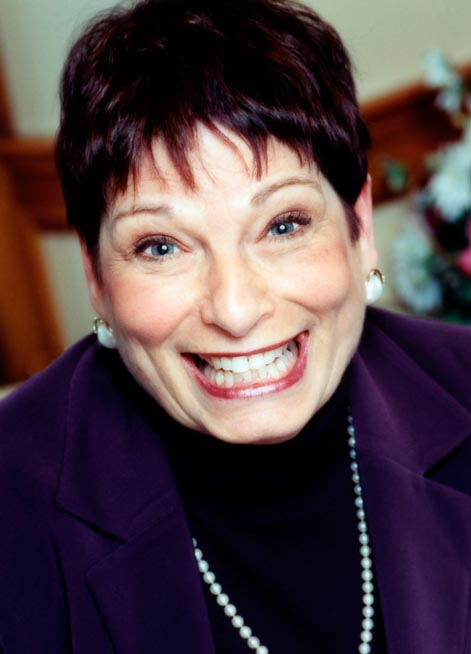
Lee P. Brown, Mayor of Houston (left), and Vera Katz, Mayor of Portland (right), attended the sculpture's dedication ceremony.

Paul Knauls, a local resident and entrepreneur who was described as the "unofficial mayor" of Northeast Portland, was "instrumental" in securing funding for the sculpture's design. Cheryl Perrin and Betsy Brumm coordinated fundraising, with assistance from Charles Lewis; before Lewis invited U.S. Senator Mark Hatfield, for whom he had worked as an intern, to speak at a breakfast fundraiser, fundraising efforts had stalled for eight years. Oregon's Congressional delegation wrote appeals to large companies, requesting their support at the breakfast. Within six months of the campaign's re-launch, $300,000 was raised, enough to create the sculpture. The Dream was dedicated by the Martin Luther King, Jr. Statue Foundation on August 28, 1998, the 35th anniversary of King's "I Have a Dream" speech. It was also dedicated by Harry Belafonte and much of the Congressional delegation. John Jenkins, chairman of the foundation, said in a statement announcing the statue and its dedication:

Our dream began in the hearts of the students at Martin Luther King Jr., Elementary School nearly ten years ago. The dream was nurtured by the late state Senator Bill McCoy, and through the donations of Oregonians and some of our state's most respected businesses; we will have an original work of art honoring the memory and ideals of one of America's greatest leaders.

Jeff Blosser, general manager of the Oregon Convention Center, said, "It is an honor for the Oregon Convention Center as well as our city, to have this significant sculpture placed here. It will be a very visible symbol for Oregonians, as well as the thousands of visitors who come to our state each year." Dedication ceremony attendees included local educator Laverne Davis, who served as "Mistress of Ceremonies"; Lee P. Brown and Vera Katz, mayors of Houston and Portland, respectively; Mike Burton of the regional government Metro; Charles Jordan, director of Portland Parks & Recreation; Bishop A. A. Wells; and Dente. Music was provided by the Martin Luther King Jr. Elementary School Choir, Ada Tillis, and the Accelerated Music Group.

In 2014, Knauls shared with Oregon Public Broadcasting that he considers the project one of his proudest accomplishments. He said the project was a major undertaking and said that "it's still surprising how many people don't even know the statue is there".

The memorial has been used as a place for gatherings. Charles Lewis announced his candidacy for Portland City Commissioner near the memorial in 2007. In 2008, a march honoring King began at the statue. In 2014, the sculpture served as the first stop on a "Housing History Tour" of Portland, sponsored by the Fair Housing Council of Oregon, the Portland Human Rights Commission, and Race Talks. It has also been included in public art guides and walking tours.

== See also ==
- 1998 in art
- Civil rights movement in popular culture
- List of memorials to Martin Luther King Jr.
