= No Vacancy Lounge =

Defunct nightclub in Portland, Oregon, U.S.

- Logo

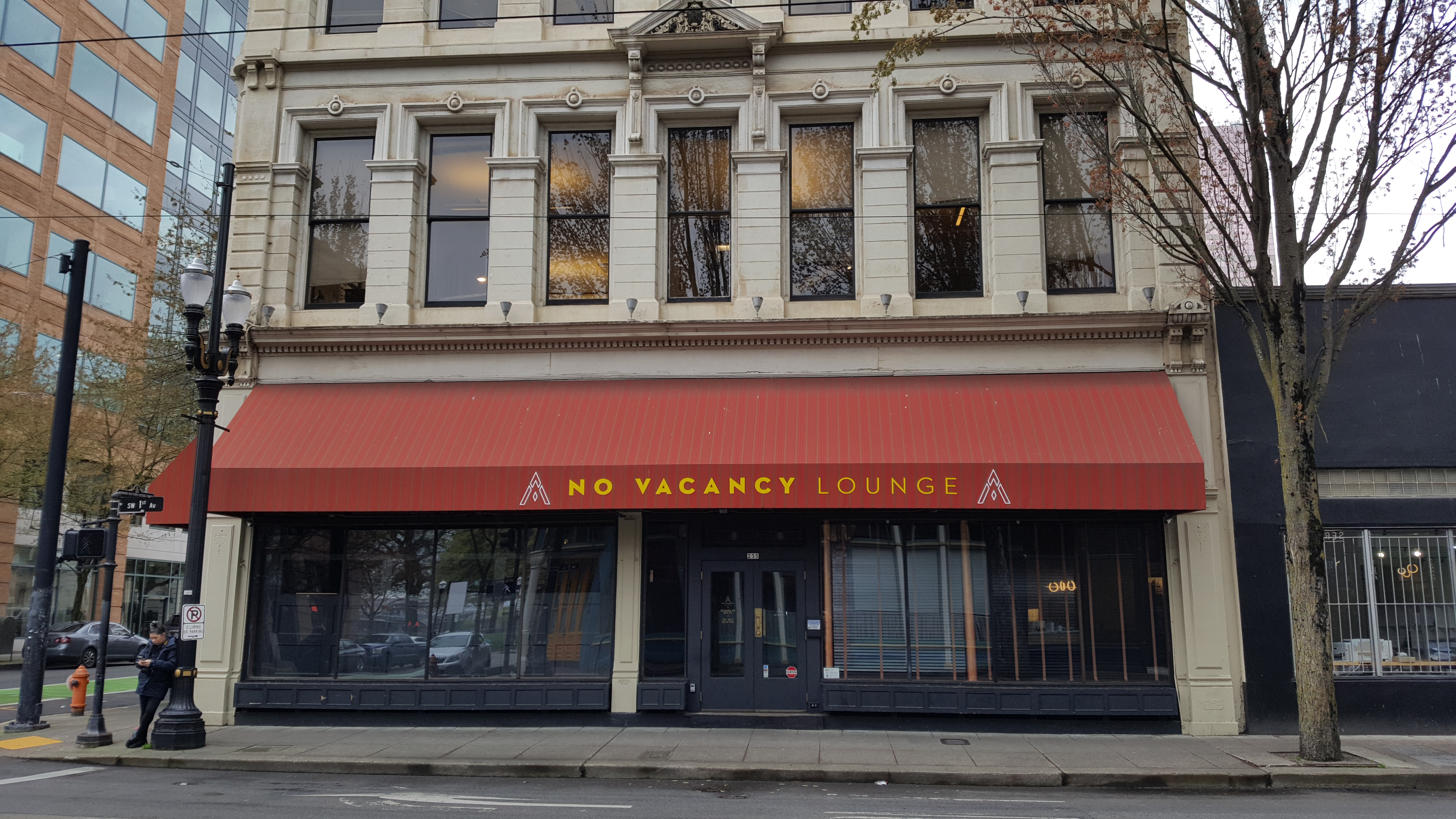
- Entrance to the venue, 2019

- Location within Portland, Oregon
- Address: 235 Southwest 1st Avenue
- Location: Portland, Oregon, U.S.
- Coordinates: 45.5206°N 122.6722°W
- Owner: Nitin Khanna; Rick Sheinin; Billy Vinton; Jessey Zepeda
- Capacity: 350
- Type: Music venue; nightclub

Construction
- Opened: 2017
- Closed: February 19, 2019

No Vacancy Lounge (NVL) was a short-lived nightclub in Portland, Oregon's Old Town Chinatown neighborhood, in the United States. "No Vacancy" began in 2014 as a party hosted at various local venues. NVL opened in a former McCormick & Schmick's restaurant December 2017, following an approximately $1 million renovation. The venue was named Willamette Week's 2018 Bar of the Year. The club hosted a variety of acts and events but was most known for electronic dance music (EDM). Conflict between NVL, a neighboring tenant, and the property manager began almost immediately. In February 2019, the bar closed as the result of the dispute and financial difficulties; some scheduled events were moved to other venues.

== Description and history ==
Prior to the nightclub's opening, No Vacancy was a party held at the FOMO Media offices in northwest Portland, beginning in 2014. The party's success allowed co-founders Rick Sheinin (who worked at FOMO Media at the time) and Billy Vinton, along with partners Nitin Khanna and Jessey Zepeda, to host No Vacancy at other venues, including Doug Fir Lounge, Holocene, and Produce Row. Lake Oswego Review's Sam Stites described the four men as "innovators" seeking to "raise the bar in Portland nightlife".

Sheinin, Vinton, and partners opened No Vacancy Lounge (NVL) in December 2017, in the ground floor of the Henry Failing Building, in downtown Portland's Old Town Chinatown neighborhood. The building was previously occupied by a McCormick & Schmick's restaurant. According to the Portland Mercury, the owners "oversaw a dramatic redesign of the wood-paneled restaurant into a modern 350-person-capacity nightclub that attracted top talent [and] drew large crowds", at a cost of approximately $1 million. The interior featured "elegantly designed" Art Deco details and high tech production equipment. Writing for Willamette Week, Matthew Korfhage said: "The mezzanined space [looked] like Jay-Z's vision of the Great Gatsby, an amber-lit world of deco lamps, columned archways and backlit liquor that climbs to the ceiling", with "a massive amount of programmable lights, a dramatically lit second-story DJ booth and smoke machines both inside and outside the DJ area".

Two weeks after opening, property owners attempted to terminate NVL's lease because of noise complaints made by the upstairs tenant, the architecture firm Walker Macy. Conflict between NVL, Melvin Mark Properties, and Walker Macy continued for as long as the nightclub operated. In February 2019, the club confirmed plans to close as the result of financial difficulties and the ongoing dispute. The co-owners have said No Vacancy "might return to its original state as a pop-up party series".

=== Events ===
NVL hosted a variety of acts and events. Performers included hip-hop disc jockey and producer DJ Nu-Mark, house music DJ Donald Glaude, the electronic music duos Dusky and Eli & Fur, Le Youth, BlackGummy, Zach Carothers of Portugal. The Man, and Canadian EDM DJ Shaun Frank. A-Trak and RJD2 performed as part of the bar's first anniversary celebration.

Special events included the "Pan-African Gala" commemorating Black History Month, which saw Ndaba Mandela pay tribute to his grandfather Nelson Mandela, a "420 Celebration" with "electro soul-funk" music, and a gay pride event featuring local EDM DJs called "Møthership: Planet LGBTQA". NVL also hosted a 1990s music dance party and a "celebration of life" for Vinton's father, Will Vinton. In 2018, the venue hosted the sixteenth annual Bollywood Halloween dance party, a concert featuring local hip-hop artists, and a Gatsby-themed New Year's Eve celebration. In 2019, NVL held "Love Sucks: An Emo Valentine's Day", a Valentine's Day dance event featuring "pop, punk, alternative, and emo classics". For their final event in the Henry Failing Building, NVL hosted a free party on February 19, 2019. NVL planned to host events scheduled prior to their closure announcement at other venues.

== Reception ==
NVL was named Willamette Week's 2018 Portland Bar of the Year based on a survey focusing on new establishments. The newspaper said the venue "strikes a careful balance between timeless glamor and a futuristic Technicolor utopia", and called NVL "the most ambitious DJ-forward dance club Portland's seen in years". Willamette Week writers also suggested the interior was reminiscent of The Great Gatsby. Sam Stites of the Lake Oswego Review said the venue opened "to rave reviews and a consistently packed house", and "[filled] a nightlife void". Stites called NVL "a fresh take on the tired nightclub motif" and wrote, "Step inside No Vacancy Lounge and you might feel as if you've gone back in time and traveled to the future all at once." Jenna Swanberg of Dance Music Northwest said NVL's closure was "devastating for us to hear, as the venue did everything right for their attendees and were selling out weekend after weekend". She wrote:

No Vacancy Lounge always had great energy, bringing in some of the biggest names in house music, providing music lovers, bar jumpers, or dance enthusiasts a safe place to spend their night... So thank you No Vacancy Lounge for bringing something different to Portland. Thank you for bringing a new energy to a city. Thank you for the unforgettable nights spent on the dance floor. We hope the energy continues to the next big idea.

== See also ==
- Culture of Portland, Oregon
