= Portland Jazz Festival =

- The 2011 Jazz Festival Logo
- Genre: Jazz
- Dates: Late February, Annually
- Location: Portland, Oregon
- Years active: Since 2003
- Website: Portland Jazz Festival

The Portland Jazz Festival, now known as the Biamp PDX Jazz Festival, is an annual multi-venue series of over 100 jazz events held during the month of February. Events are presented throughout Portland, Oregon in such venues as P5 Center for the Performing Arts, Jimmy Mak's (now closed), The Old Church, Classic Pianos, McMenamin's Al's Den, Aladdin Theater, Alberta Rose Theater, Alberta Abbey Theater, Revolution Hall, Mississippi Studios and other various ballrooms, clubs, hotels and cafés. The event is organized around a new theme each year including Coltrane at 90, Sinatra at 100, Tribute to Blue Note, The Jazz Message: Celebrating Art Blakey. The festival is produced by PDX Jazz, a 501(c)(3) not-for-profit organization. The festival has featured such artists as Charles McPherson, Pharoah Sanders, Dee Dee Bridgewater, Randy Weston, David Frishberg, Esperanza Spalding, Ravi Coltrane, Jim Hall, Nicholas Payton, Tom Grant, Wayne Shorter, Regina Carter, Morten Qvenild, Dianne Reeves, and McCoy Tyner.

This festival went virtual in 2021.

== See also ==
- Culture of Portland, Oregon
- List of festivals in the United States
  - List of music festivals in the United States
- List of jazz festivals
