= Steelhead (venue) =

Proposed building in the United States

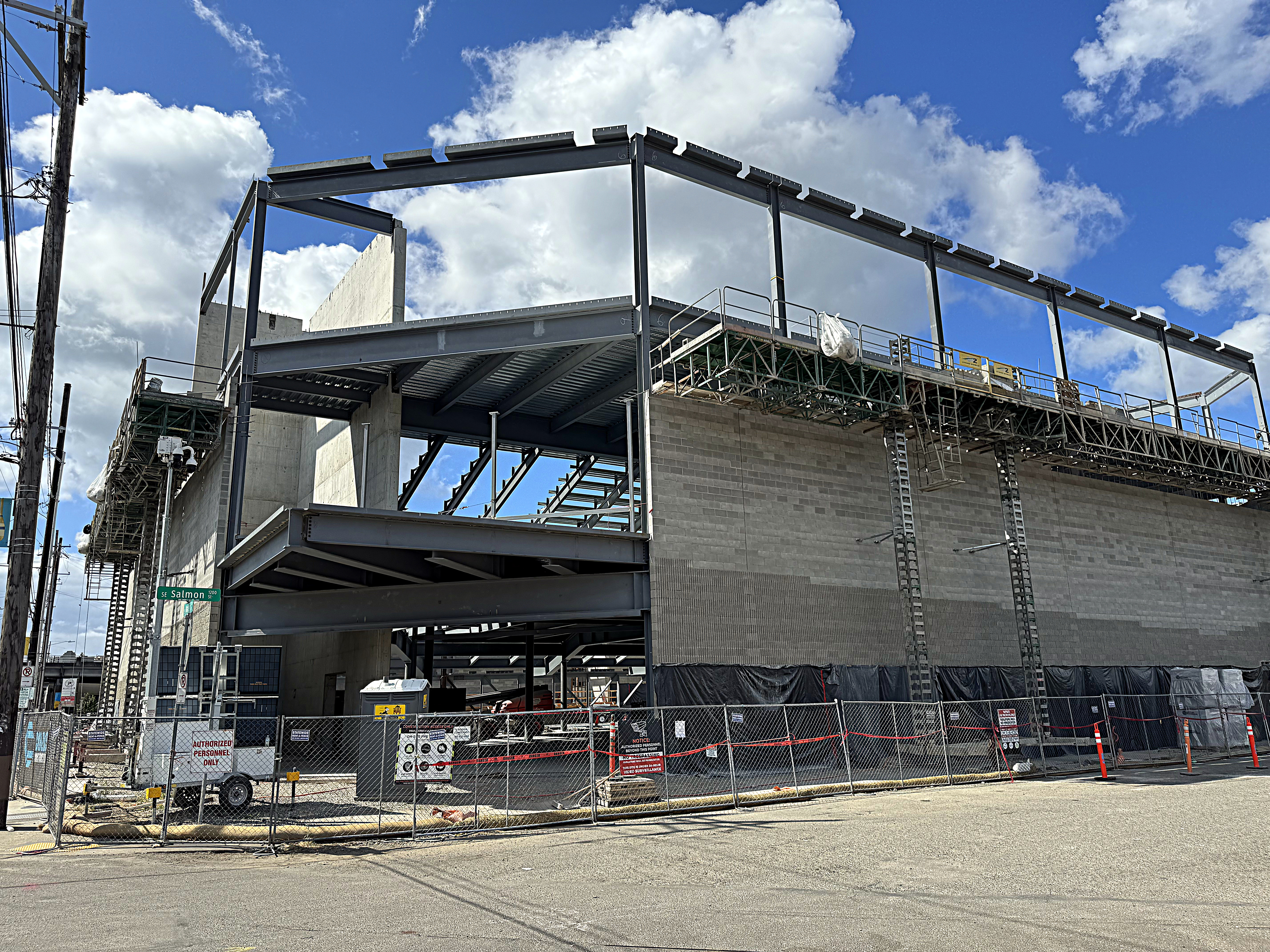
- The venue under construction in August 2026
- Interactive map of Steelhead
- Address: Portland, Oregon; United States
- Coordinates: 45.514°N 122.667°W

Construction
- Architect: Lever Architecture
- Builders: Colas Construction; Beam Development

Steelhead is a music venue under construction in Portland, Oregon, United States. It will be operated by Live Nation Entertainment. The venue will have a capacity of 3,500 people and be located on Water Avenue between Salmon and Main streets in southeast Portland. It is slated to open in summer 2027.

The project has received opposition from some community members and city officials. According to Portland Monthly, "news of Live Nation coming to Portland riled a significant and vocal portion of the local scene." The magazine said Jamie Dunphy was the most vocal opponent.

== History ==
The city approved development in mid 2024. In September 2024, a board of commissioners for Prosper Portland approved the sale of a vacant city lot for the venue. The building permit was issued in September 2025. Colas Construction and Beam Development will construct the venue, which was designed by Lever Architecture.

== See also ==
- Culture of Portland, Oregon
