= Cotton Club (Portland, Oregon) =

Nightclub in North Portland, Oregon, US

- Interactive map of Cotton Club
- Address: Portland, Oregon; United States
- Coordinates: 45.538621°N 122.668024°W

The Cotton Club was a nightclub located in North Portland, Oregon, United States. Located at 2125 N. Vancouver Avenue (and N. Tillamook Street), the club gained attention during the 1960s as the "only nightclub on the West Coast with wall-to-wall soul." Celebrities such as Cab Calloway, Sammy Davis Jr., Cass Elliot, The Kingston Trio, Joe Louis, and Archie Moore would visit the nightclub when they were in town.

== Background ==
The Cotton Club, located within the Albina area of North Portland, was a jazz nightclub that rose to fame in the 1960s. Paul Knauls moved to Portland, Oregon in 1963 in order to purchase the club.

The jazz club was one of many black owned businesses that occupied the area at the time. It was located in a neighborhood where African-Americans settled after Vanport was destroyed by flooding in 1948 and Interstate 5 and the Memorial Coliseum uprooted a number of black-owned business. By the 1960s, it was part of a thriving area that included the Blue Ribbon Barbecue, Lew's Men's Shop, and the House of Fortune Cafe.

== History ==
The Cotton Club was named after a famous nightclub located in Harlem, New York. The Cotton Club was initially a supper club converted from an auto garage by Ralph Flowers and operated by Lee Thompson. After Flowers' death in 1961, the club and itself and the property it sat on were left to his family, close friends, and an auto mechanic who owned an adjacent property. Those individuals included Lenora Gaskin, Evelyn Purdue, Eddie Smith, Roy Vassar Miller, Harry Hardy, and Peterson Cooper. After taking over active management of the Cotton Club, Roy Vassar Miller found that the club's de facto manager, Knauls, was violating his terms of employment by diverting resources to his other business. Miller offered Knauls an ultimatum, which ultimately led to the closure of the club in 1970.

The Cotton Club was part of the Chitlin' Circuit, which was a network of venues on the West Coast that were safe for African American performers to play their music. Many of the celebrities that came to the Portland area to perform would finish their evening at the Cotton Club. In addition to being a popular spot for celebrities on the Chitlin's Circuit, the club gained traction among white community after being featured in the column “Baker’s Dozen” written by Doug Baker of the Oregon Journal. The club was successful for about seven years until its doors closed in 1970. Notable performers included:

- Sammy Davis Jr. and Cab Calloway
- Duke Ellington
- Mel Brown, who went on to be the drummer for Diana Ross
- Calvin Walker, The Sander's Brothers, Seven Souls, and Sunday's Child were all involved with the cotton club early in their musical careers
- Ron Steen
- Renn Woods

== See also ==
- Culture of Portland, Oregon
- Jazz in Portland, Oregon
- Music of Oregon
