= Jack London Revue =

Coordinates: 45.51940°N 122.67630°W

- Logo

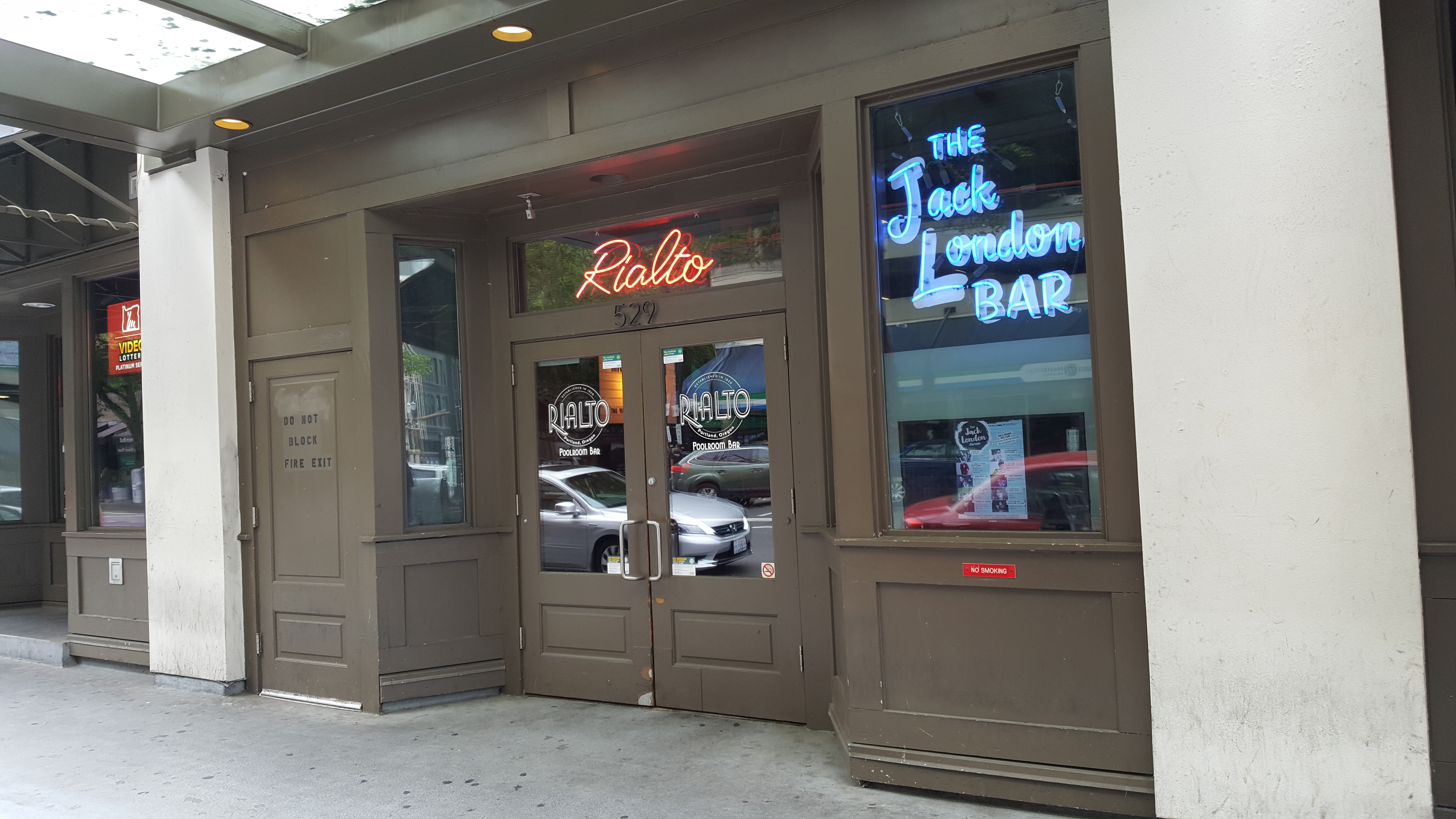
- Entrance to Rialto and Jack London, 2018

- Location within Portland, Oregon
- Location: Portland, Oregon, U.S.

Website
- jacklondonrevue.com

The Jack London Revue is a jazz club in Portland, Oregon, United States. The venue is beneath the Rialto Poolroom Bar and Cafe at the intersection of Fourth Avenue and Alder Street in downtown Portland. It opened on May 27, 2017, shortly after Jimmy Mak's closed, and replacing the Jack London Bar. The venue is owned by Frank Faillace and Manish Patel. It has a seating capacity of 220, as of June 2017.

== See also ==
- Culture of Portland, Oregon
- List of jazz venues in the United States
