= Mt. Hood Jazz Festival =

Annual jazz festival in Oregon

- Genre: Jazz
- Date: August
- Frequency: Annual
- Location: Gresham, Oregon
- Years active: 44
- Inaugurated: 1982
- Most recent: 2024
- Attendance: up to 10,000/day
- Website: https://www.mhcc.edu/Mt-Hood-Jazz-Festival/

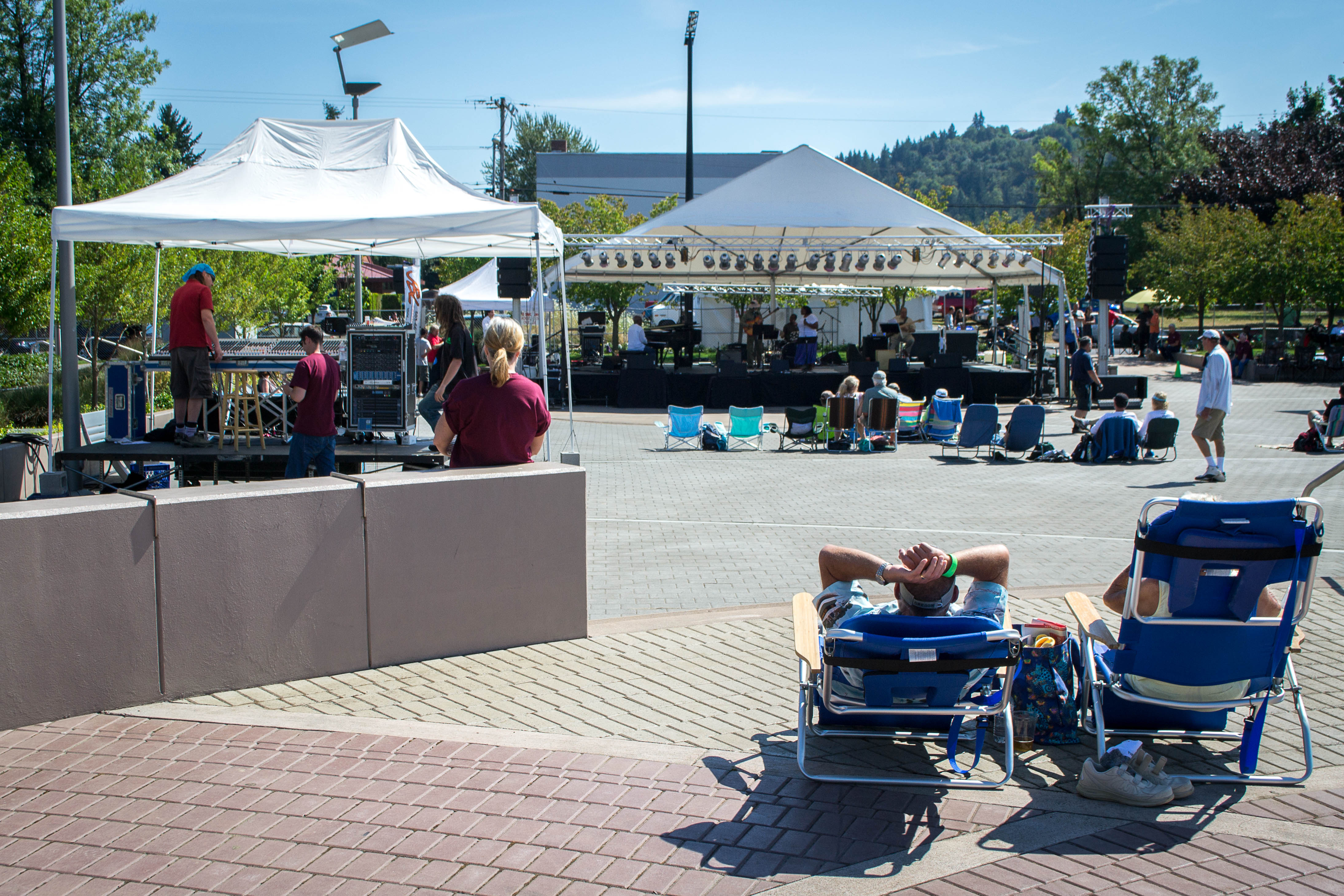
Festival in 2013

The Mt. Hood Jazz Festival is an annual jazz festival held in Gresham, Oregon.

== History ==
Beginning in 1982, the festival took place on the campus of Mt. Hood Community College for many years, then moving to downtown Gresham for five years (2003 through 2007) before returning to the college. Attendance dropped in the 2000s, from an earlier peak of around 10,000 per day to about 1,200 per day at the 2007 festival. The festival was scheduled for April 2020 at the MHCC campus but the COVID-19 pandemic forced its cancellation.
