= Jimmy Mak's =

Defunct jazz club in Portland, Oregon, U.S.

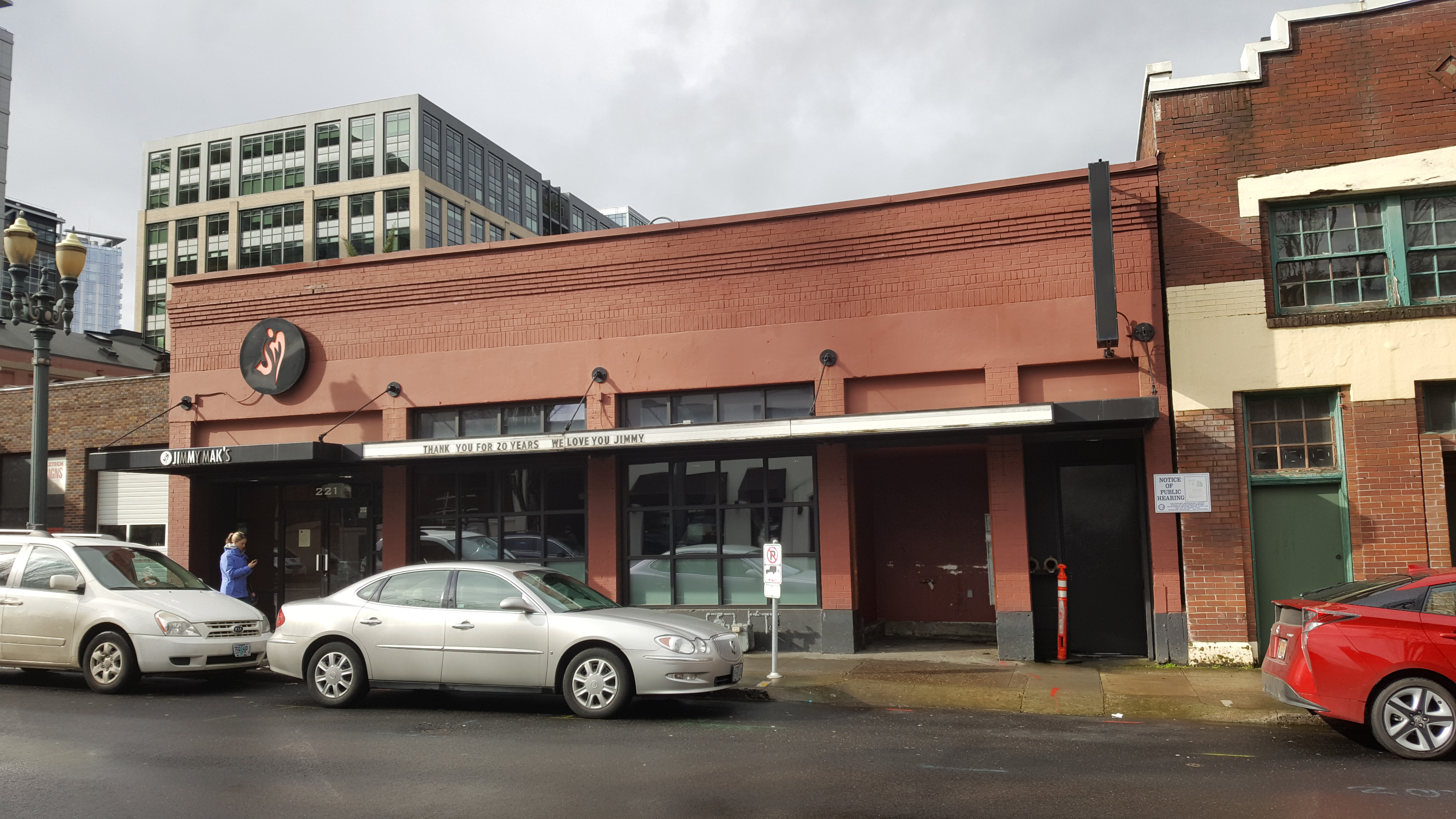
- The club's exterior in 2017, after closing

- Location in Portland, Oregon
- Location: Portland, Oregon, United States
- Coordinates: 45°31′29.4″N 122°40′53″W
- Owner: Jimmy Makarounis
- Type: Jazz club

Construction
- Opened: 1996
- Closed: December 31, 2016

Website
- jimmymaks.com

Jimmy Mak's was a jazz club in Portland, Oregon's Pearl District, in the United States. It was established in 1996 and closed on December 31, 2016.

== History ==
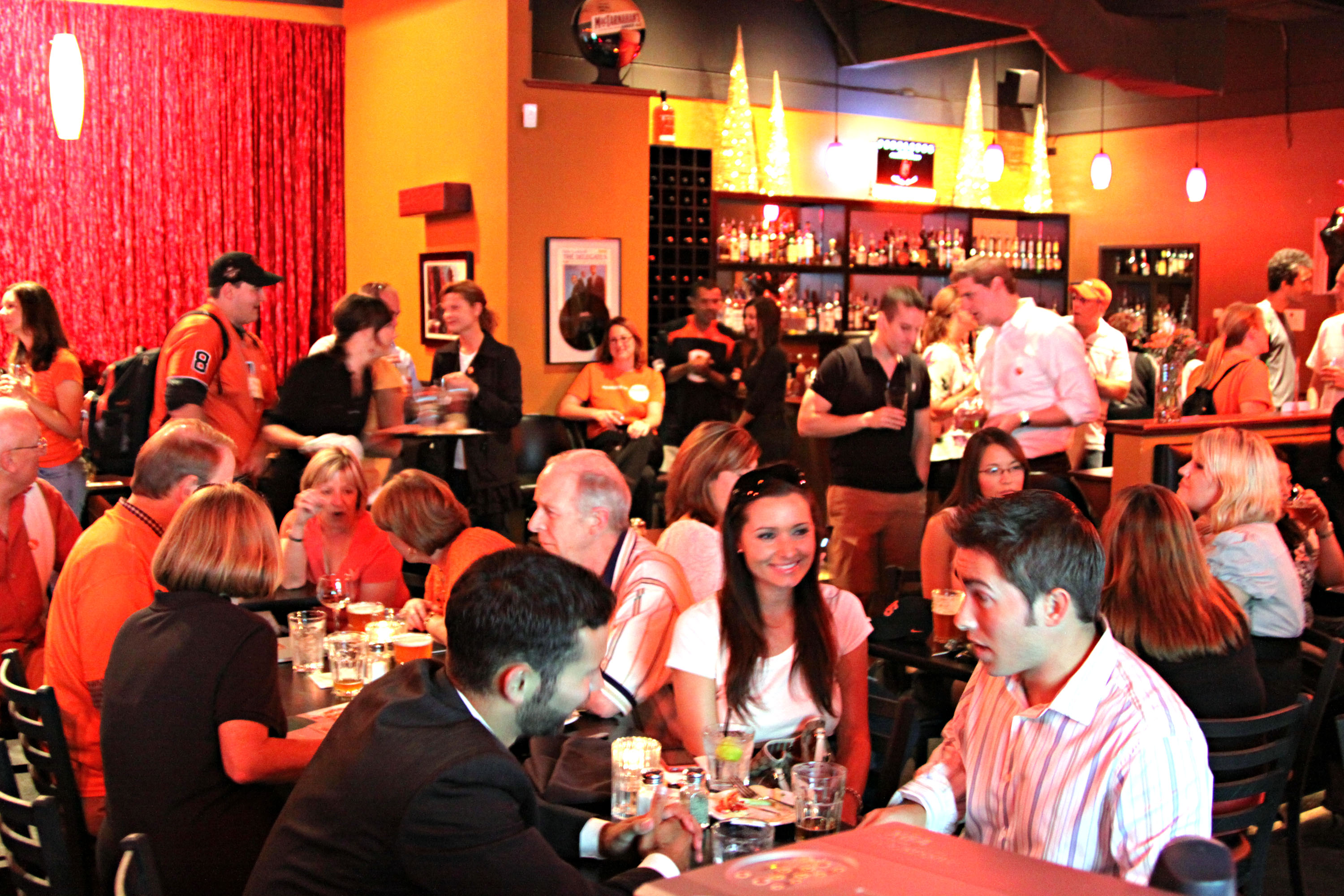
Interior of the club, 2009

Jimmy Mak's opened in 1996. Owners included Jimmy Makarounis, aka Jimmy Mak, his wife and his parents. The jazz club hosted many groups, including some led by Mel Brown and Dan Balmer.

In February 2016, the building which housed Jimmy Mak's was sold for development. The club's final performance was held Dec. 31, 2016. Makarounis died two days later, at age 53. He made plans to relocate the club to the intersection of Northwest 10th and Everett, in 2017. However, in November 2016, Makarounis announced that the venue's last show would be on December 31 (New Year's Eve). He told The Oregonian:

It is with a heavy heart I make this announcement... As many of you know, I have been battling larynx cancer for these past four years, and I simply need to step away from the business to focus on healing and beating this disease, once and for all... This is the very last thing I wanted to see happen with the business, and we have explored many options for trying to keep the business open and to try to find another operator or group of investors that could keep the business going. Unfortunately, we have not been able to do so.

Makarounis confirmed Jimmy Mak's availability if someone wanted to re-open the club after a fully funded relocation. The venue's closure marked an end to Portland's most prominent jazz performance space.

There are plans to reopen Jimmy Mak's in the Pearl District in 2019.

== See also ==
- Culture of Portland, Oregon
- List of jazz clubs
- List of jazz venues in the United States
