= Isenberg (disambiguation) =

Isenberg was a county of medieval Germany.

"Isenberg" may also refer to:

== Places ==
- Limburg-Isenberg, a county of medieval Germany

== People ==
- Andrew C. Isenberg (b. 1964), American professor of history
- Bruno of Altena-Isenberg (d. 1258), German noble
- Caroline Rose Isenberg (1961–1984), American actress and murder victim
- Clive Isenberg, Australian businessman
- Cyril Isenberg, English physicist
- Daniel Isenberg, American author and professor of entrepreneurship practice
- Dietrich I of Isenberg (before 1215 – 1301), German noble
- Dietrich II of Isenberg-Limburg (d. 1328), German aristocrat
- Frederick of Isenberg (1193–1226), German noble
- James A. Isenberg (b. 1951), American theoretical physicist, mathematician, and professor
- Johann of Isenberg-Limburg (before 1246 – before 1277), German aristocrat
- Karl Wilhelm Isenberg (1806–1864), German missionary and linguist
- Lauren Isenberg (b. 2002), Canadian singer-songwriter known professionally as Renforshort
- Lynn Isenberg, American author, producer, and screenwriter
- Marty Isenberg (b. 1963), American animation writer
- Nancy Isenberg, American historian
- Noah Isenberg (b. 1967), American author and professor of film
- Petra Isenberg, computer scientist
- Phillip Isenberg (b. 1939), American politician in California
- Walter Isenberg (b. 1958), American businessman and investor
- Fae Searcy née Isenberg (d. 1968), American politician in Illinois

== Other ==
- Isenberg School of Management, the business school at the University of Massachusetts Amherst
- Journals of Isenberg and Krapf, an 1843 journal

== See also ==
- Isenburg (disambiguation)
