= Independence Day in Portland, Oregon =

Annual community celebration

The American federal holiday Independence Day (or the Fourth of July) is celebrated annually in Portland, Oregon. Large fireworks shows are held at Tom McCall Waterfront Park and Oaks Amusement Park and can be viewed from various sites around the city. Other activities have included parades, picnics, and laser lighting displays.

In 2025, the Oregon Historical Society displayed an American flag believed to be the first flown in Portland after Oregon became a state. The museum exhibited the flag for a limited time in honor of the holiday.

== Events and activities ==
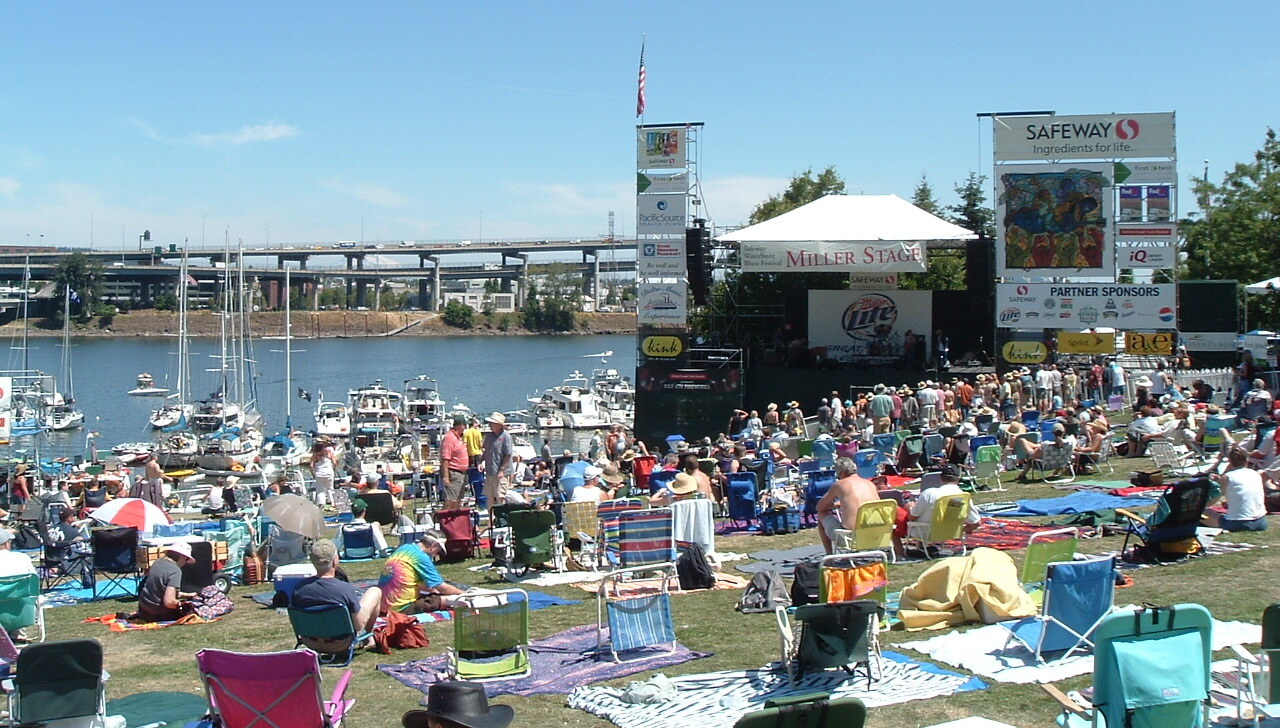
Waterfront Blues Festival, 2007

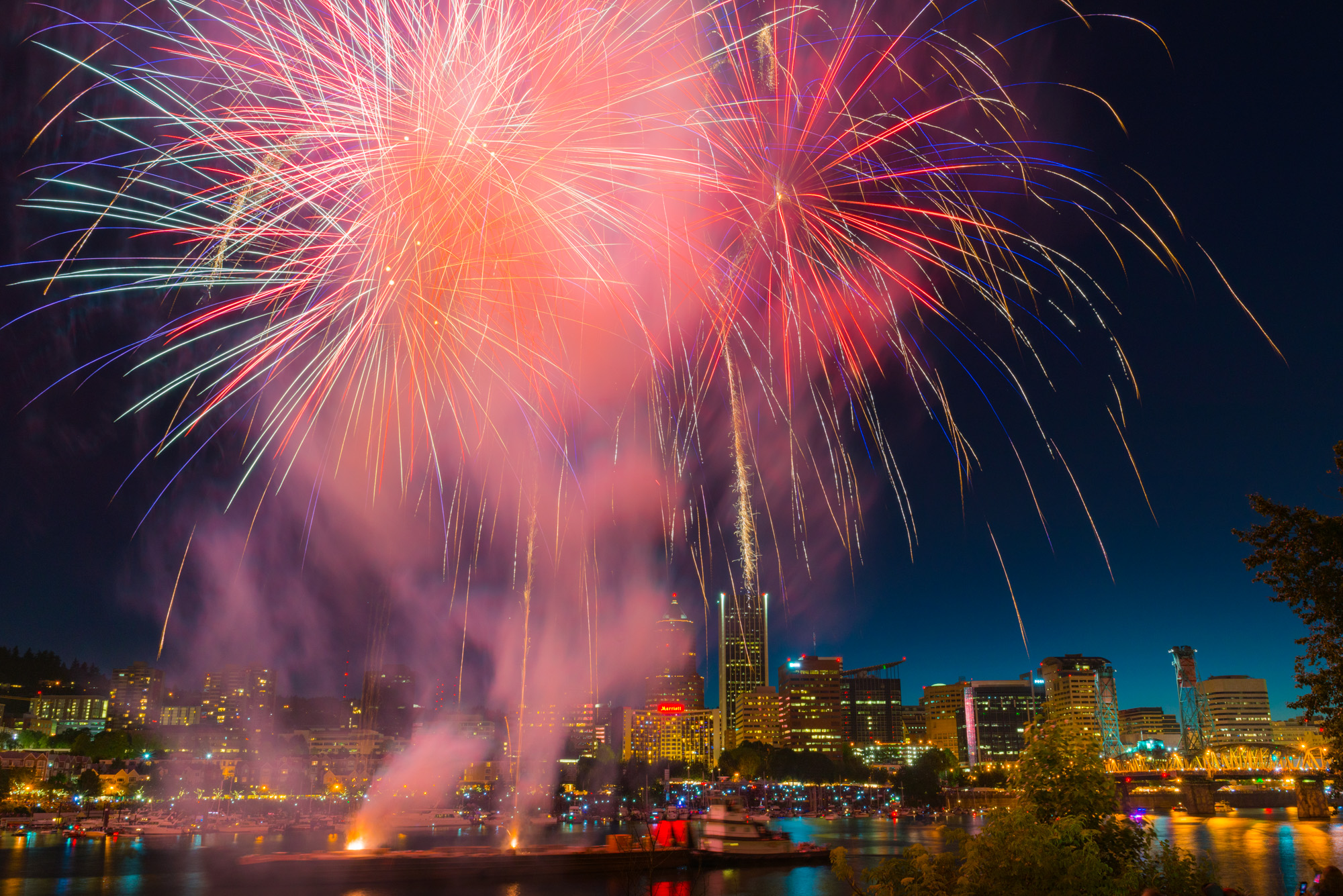
Fireworks at the Waterfront Blues Festival, as part of Independence Day celebrations in 2013

The city allows select fireworks shows by licensed professionals. The Waterfront Blues Festival is usually held on the holiday weekend at Tom McCall Waterfront Park and kicks off with a large fireworks show visible from other locations such as the Eastbank Esplanade, the Hawthorne Bridge and Morrison Bridge, the International Rose Test Garden in Washington Park, and Mount Tabor. Other recommended viewing sites have included Rocky Butte, the docks along Marine Drive in Northeast Portland, and parts of the West Hills near Oregon Health and Science University. The fireworks show was 22 minutes long in 2019. It took hundreds of hours to prepare and was watched by thousands of people. In 2022 and 2024, a silent disco was held on Tilikum Crossing on the holiday, ahead of the fireworks show at Waterfront Park. The Portland Spirit hosts dinner cruises on the Willamette River for the fireworks show. Some restaurants offer dinner specials with views of the fireworks show; notable establishments doing so in 2019 included the defunct Altabira City Tavern at Hotel Eastlund, Clarklewis, Portland City Grill, and Roof Deck at Revolution Hall. Jamie Hale included the Waterfront Blues Festival in The Oregonian's 2018 list of Oregon's 50 best events. The festival's fireworks display is the largest executed by Western Display Fireworks.

Oaks Amusement Park in the Sellwood-Moreland neighborhood of Southeast Portland hosts a Fourth of July Spectacular, which includes a fireworks show also visible from Oaks Bottom Wildlife Refuge, Sellwood Riverfront Park, and Willamette Park. In Southeast Portland's Eastmoreland neighborhood, the neighborhood association hosts an annual parade, which starts at an elementary school and travels along Reed College Place. The event includes antique cars, bike decorating, and marching bands. In 2025, KPTV called the celebration "a classic local tradition" with a "neighborhood energy". Approximately 1,000 people were expected to participate in the 31st annual parade in 2025.

Public activities were limited in 2020 and 2021 because of the COVID-19 pandemic; in 2020, the city saw protests over the holiday weekend. In 2024, First Thursday in the Pearl District of Northwest Portland fell on July 4, so organizers expanded the event with more vendors and hosted Picnic in the Pearl. The event returned in 2025. The baseball team Portland Pickles hosted "Independence Day Extravaganza and 'Merica Night" in 2024, with a laser lighting display instead of fireworks because of a ban. In 2025, F-15 Eagle fighter jets out of Portland Air National Guard Base flew over the region; in Portland, the flight path went over the Hollywood neighborhood of Northeast Portland.

== Personal fireworks ==
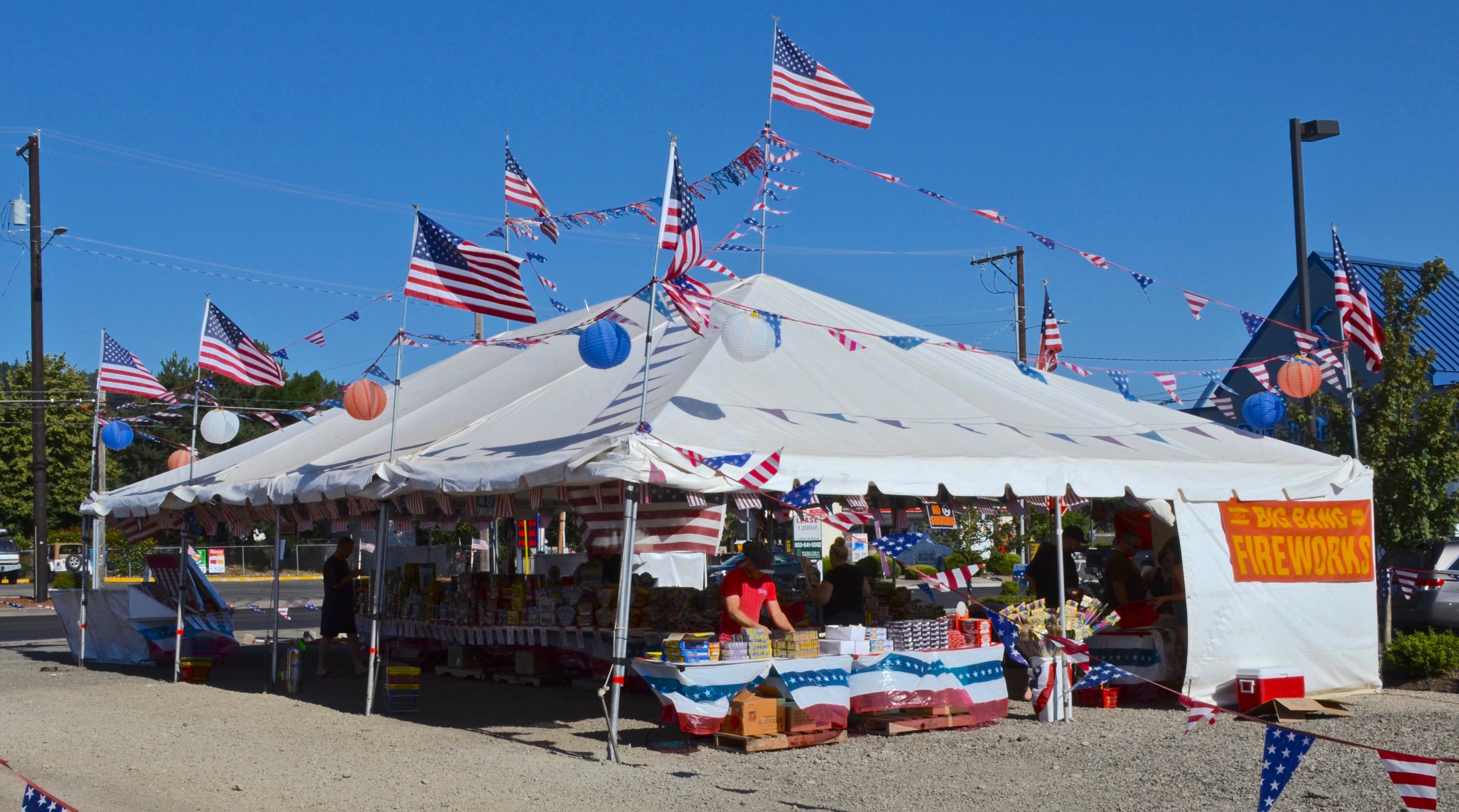
Fireworks stand in Southeast Portland in 2017

The city banned personal use of fireworks in 2022 to reduce wildfire risk. Previously, fireworks sales were allowed for the two weeks from June 23 to July 6, and in 2021 Mayor Ted Wheeler signed an emergency declaration banning the use of fireworks due to drought conditions. In 2025, The Oregonian said: "Recent data shows the Portland ban may be working. Of the 38 fires reported to the Portland Fire Bureau last year on July 4, only 14 were caused by fireworks. That's down from 2023 when 30 of 67 blazes were due to fireworks." People who use fireworks illegally may be fined up to $500; sellers can be fined $2,500.

In 2023, fireworks started at least 25 fires in Portland, one of which destroyed a vacant building in the Lloyd District. In 2024, Oregon Public Broadcasting said: "Reporting by Willamette Week found that although the number of fires caused by fireworks dipped during the year the ban was enacted, the number of fireworks-related fires increased by 33% in 2023 compared with 2022." In 2025, a new tool was developed to report illegal fireworks in the city. The bureau received between 4,000 and 4,300 reports related to fireworks on Independence Day in 2025, none of which were for major incidents, according to KGW. The Portland Police Bureau has urged the public to avoid calling the emergency telephone number 911 to report illegal fireworks.

== Public transport and services ==
The holiday impacts local public transport and services, including city office closures, weekend transit schedules, bridge closures, and the enforcement of parking meters. TriMet's bus and MAX Light Rail services follow weekend schedules, while Portland Aerial Tram and WES Commuter Rail services stop altogether for the holiday. The Hawthorne Bridge and Morrison Bridge are closed because "in prior years ... crowds of pedestrians would generally gather on the bridges to watch the show and cause safety issues", according to The Oregonian.

== See also ==
- Culture of Portland, Oregon
