= CoCo Key Water Resort =

American water park chain

- Industry: Water parks
- Founded: 2006
- Defunct: 2011 (as a nationwide brand)
- Fate: Great Recession caused the original company to collapse, and other locations split off into third-party owners, which have been closed due to chlorine problems and code violations
- Successor: Splash Cincinnati; Water Park of New England
- Owner: Sage Hospitality Group; Wave Development; Hexagon Investments
- Website: Archived 2009-01-18 at the Wayback Machine

CoCo Key Water Resort is a brand that has been used for nearly a dozen hotel-attached water parks aimed at children and families in the United States since 2006. The company marketed itself as cheaper alternative to Great Wolf Lodge and Kalahari Resorts. Currently, the brand is only used for a hotel and water park in Orlando, Florida. The brand was previously used for several water parks in the Northeast and Midwest.

At its peak, ten CoCo Key water parks operated, with each including indoor and outdoor sections, arcade rooms, a service bar, and a snack shack branded to A&W and Pizza Hut. The CoCo Key theme is meant to resemble 1930s Key West.

== History ==
=== Early history ===
CoCo Key Water Resort in Orlando ribbon cutting

CoCo Key started operations in 2006 in the mid-2000's real estate boom. The brand was founded by the Sage Hospitality Group based in Denver, the Wave Development LLC based in Wisconsin, the Hexagon Investments Inc., and other companies. The company's business model was to attach water parks to underperforming hotels. In December, CoCo Key locations opened in Columbus, Ohio, and Arlington Heights, Illinois. In 2007, it was planned to open waterparks in Boston and Rockford, Illinois.

Sage struggled in water park industry after the 2008 financial crisis. Even before the crisis, the parks were criticized for high operating and franchise costs and for catering to two largely different demographics; business and leisure. The hotels were underperforming with the business crowd and the resorts left families unsatisfied due to their value engineering and lack of theming for appeal with business guests. Great Wolf Lodge suffered less from the recession than Sage did, occupancy for the Great Wolf Lodge only dropped by 5%.

A two day auction in 2011 between February 15 and 17, sold ten of the branded water parks individually on Auction.com after failing to sell the properties for several months. These hotels sold at large discounts. The Sheraton hotel and waterpark in Arlington Heights, Illinois, sold for $18,000 per room and another resort in Ohio sold for $24,500 per room. In contrast, two other unrelated properties from Sage sold at $260,000 and $370,000 per room. The CoCo Key branding was kept after the hotels were sold. It was concluded that the added water park lowered the value of the hotels.

=== Danvers location ===
In March 2008, CoCo Key Water Resort in Danvers, Massachusetts was ordered to close by the state of Massachusetts after families reported chemical burns on their children due to high chloramine levels; fifteen times the allowed limit. The location was ordered to stay closed until proper chlorine testing kits were used and thermometers were installed on the hot tubs. Ron Sevart, vice president of Sage's brand management responded by stating how the issue was "new to the industry" and that they contained the burns and skin irritation to 30-40 people.

In 2012, the CoCo Key in Danvers, Massachusetts had a $10,000,000 renovation and a hotel rebrand to the DoubleTree by Hilton - Northshore after a franchise agreement. The water park was kept.

=== Rockford location ===
In 2011, the Illinois Department of Public Health closed CoCo Key Water Resort and the attached Best Western Clock Tower Resort in Rockford, Illinois as the facility wasn't up to state and federal regulations.

Between March 25, 2014 and April 20, 2015, the Winnebago County Health Department inspected the Coco Key Resort 18 times; six were due to complaints about sanitary and health concerns and 12 were follow-up visits. The inspection found that some pools had an excess amount of chlorine while others had no measurable amounts. On April 20, 2015, the location was temporarily closed by the health department.

On July 31, 2015, it was reported that an adult woman needed seven stitches after she had cut her heel on a children's waterslide, and the lifeguard that treated her only wore one glove. The accident wasn't reported to the health department, a violation of state code.

On August 4, 2015, another inspection from the health department found large bolts used to hold down the mats in the children's play area, a broken lazy river pump suction gauge, and illegal water and air temperatures, at 98 degrees and 79 degrees respectively. In the department's latest inspection in August, they found water park violations including improper pH levels, a non-present certified pool operator, sediment at the bottom of pools, "floating matter" present on the surface of a pool, and dirty pool decks. The property also had other violations with peeling paint, leaking pipes, an odor of mildew, and an unclean and unmaintained restroom; including broken urinals and toilet paper held up by paper clips and wires.

On August 6, 2015, the location's license was revoked by the health department for uncorrected violations resulting from general negligence which resulted in public health and safety concerns. Todd Marshall, the Health Department's Director of Environmental Health, stated that they set up an agreement and offered a public hearing, however, this wasn't followed up by the Clock Tower Resort. This prompted the hotel to put up signs on its door stating that the resort was closed for maintenance purposes.

On August 20, 2015, the water park was condemned by the city of Rockford due to gas leaks, plumbing leaks, water leaks near electrical equipment, and poor ventilation. On September 4, a follow up inspection requested by the resort, found a water leak in one of the elevator shafts, which left the elevator unusable. This led to the elevator shaft needing to be pumped out. On September 8, the city tried to find the source of the leak. These violations originally cost the location $250,000.

In December 2015, Steve Hsu, the manager of the site, stated that they were addressing the site's violations, however, the location couldn't reopen without city and health department’s approval, which included making repairs to the temperature control system. The initial estimate indicated this would take four months and cost $200,000.

In October 2016, a shooting took place at the site, leaving one person dead and two injured. The city of Rockford was considering penalizing the location and the resort was ordered to update its violations days after the shooting. The resort was ordered to close in November by Rockford. In April 2017, the building was condemned by the city for unsafe conditions, including non-working fire alarms and no power. After its abandonment, the property had been vandalized with graffiti as well as having broken windows, and walls, fencing, and damaged air ducts.

In May 2017, the Clock Tower Resort was bought for $3.6 million. Weeks later, the clocks were removed from the structure. On April 16, 2018, the Clock Tower hotel began demolition, leaving only the waterpark standing; which planned to be razed in 2020 as well. Hard Rock International donated the waterpark's equipment to Six Flags Hurricane Harbor Rockford and Six Flags Great America, which took some netting and pumping equipment.

=== Omaha location ===
In September 2012, a hazmat crew was called to deal with a chlorine gas leak in the CoCo Key Water Resort in Omaha, Nebraska.

In July 2018, the Douglas County health department closed the CoCo Key water park in Omaha after noting: rough and loose flooring in the lazy river, sand in the bottom of a pool due to a bad filtration filter, malfunctioning pool lights, and an inability to find lifeguard certifications. It was also found that the first aid kits needed refilling. In response, Mario Mandolfo, the site's general manager, stated that the lifeguard certificates were in his office, not the water park's. He also stated that they took a "band aid" approach to fixing things and that he took full blame for the violations. Mandolfo paid $50,000 in repairs. The site had trouble reopening after the bank foreclosed it. On October 18, the location opened with a new set of employees and financial assistance from a bank in South Dakota.

In 2021, the location was sold by an outside developer. Two months later, in June, the site was closed again by the county health department after a complaint from Janie Rapier, who visited the hotel as a guest.

=== Sharonville location ===
In May 2015, Coco Key Resort's water park in Sharonville, Ohio was ordered to temporarily close by the Ohio Department of Agriculture due to a broken water sanitizer system, which had been partially broken since February of that year. An officer for the Hamilton County Department of Health also stated that the site got complaints about the pool and bed bugs, but nothing extreme.

On November 10, the location was closed and evacuated by the state's fire marshal after over one-hundred violations including non-working sprinklers, unfunctional fire alarms, and blocked, malfunctioning, or unsafe emergency exits. CoCo key's director of operations agreed with the fire marshal's decision, stating that the company would try to get the problems solved to get the property up and running. An inspector was planned for the next day. On November 11, the property was worked on by a contractor and the franchise's owner, Kumar Vemulapalli, stated that he didn't know anything about the May and November violations as he thought the building was in working condition. He also stated that the same fire marshal closed his Travel Lodge Hotel in Sharonville.

=== Orlando location ===
Parrot's Perch

The CoCo Key Hotel & Water Resort in Orlando is a 54,000 square feet (5,000 m^{2}) outdoor waterpark with a shaded section. This includes a tipping bucket, slides, and heated pools. An arcade, a quick service, and a full service restaurant, are attached.

In 1970, the hotel originally opened as Hilton Inn South, which was the first hotel on International Drive. The hotel was used as a training location for Disney's cast members prior to Disney's Contemporary Resort. Later, the location was rebranded to Ramada and then to the Legacy Grand Hotel.

The hotel underwent a $19 million renovation and it reopened on April 23, 2010, as a CoCo Key Resort. Upon opening, this property was owned by CNL Financial Group, though it has since changed hands.

On March 18, 2017, a nine-year-old boy was taken to the Arnold Palmer Hospital for Children after he was found unconscious after nearly drowning in an unattended pool where signs were posted that kids under 16 had to be accompanied by an adult.

In 2020, the resort was renovated alongside changing ownership.

== Former locations ==
All of these locations were owned by Hexagon Investments, and were auctioned off in February 2011 (other than Arlington Heights, as it had been closed and sold off previously).

Location	Associated hotel(s)	Opened	Closed	Notes
Arlington Heights, Illinois (serving the Chicago area)	Sheraton Chicago Northwest Hotel	December 2006	December 2009	Closed due to the 2008 Global Recession.
Rockford, Illinois	Best Western Clock Tower Resort	January 2007	August 20, 2015	Shut down by the city of Rockford. The resort was later demolished and replaced with a Hard Rock Casino, which opened on August 29, 2024.
Newark, Ohio (serving the Columbus area)	Cherry Valley Lodge	December 2006	November 2017	Closed due to low attendance. The water park portion was demolished and renovated as the Ohio Event Center in 2019.
Danvers, Massachusetts (serving the Boston area)	Sheraton Ferncroft Resort	May 2007	March 2020	Closed due to COVID-19 pandemic, later reopened as Water Park of New England.
Omaha, Nebraska	Holiday Inn Omaha Convention Center	September 2007	June 2021	Shut down by health department. An apartment complex and a two story dentistry are planned on the site.
Sharonville, Ohio (serving the Cincinnati area)	Crowne Plaza and Fairfield Inn	November 2007	May 2016	Changed management and reopened as Splash Cincinnati in May 2016, shut down by health department in July 2018.
Kansas City, Missouri	Sheraton Kansas City Sports Complex Hotel	May 2008	March 2020	Closed due to COVID-19 pandemic. The location was replaced with a pickleball stadium in 2025. In 2026, the site was later redeveloped with mixed-use development for the Truman Sports Complex and its world cup events.
Waterbury, Connecticut (serving the Hartford area)	Holiday Inn Waterbury	October 2008	May 1, 2016	The associated hotel and resort were demolished and replaced with a Restaurant Depot, which opened on December 6, 2017.
Mount Laurel, New Jersey (serving the Philadelphia area)	Marriott Mount Laurel	November 2008	March 2020	Closed due to COVID-19 pandemic. On August 9, the location was auctioned off. In October 2023, the property was announced to reopen under a new name. (Note: No sources state that this water park opened)
Fitchburg, Massachusetts	Courtyard Fitchburg	December 2008	September 2013	Acquired by the Great Wolf Lodge by 2013, reopened after major renovations on June 5, 2014.

== See also ==
- Fort Rapids, an abandoned waterpark in Columbus, Ohio
