= The Original Dinerant =

Defunct diner in Portland, Oregon, U.S.

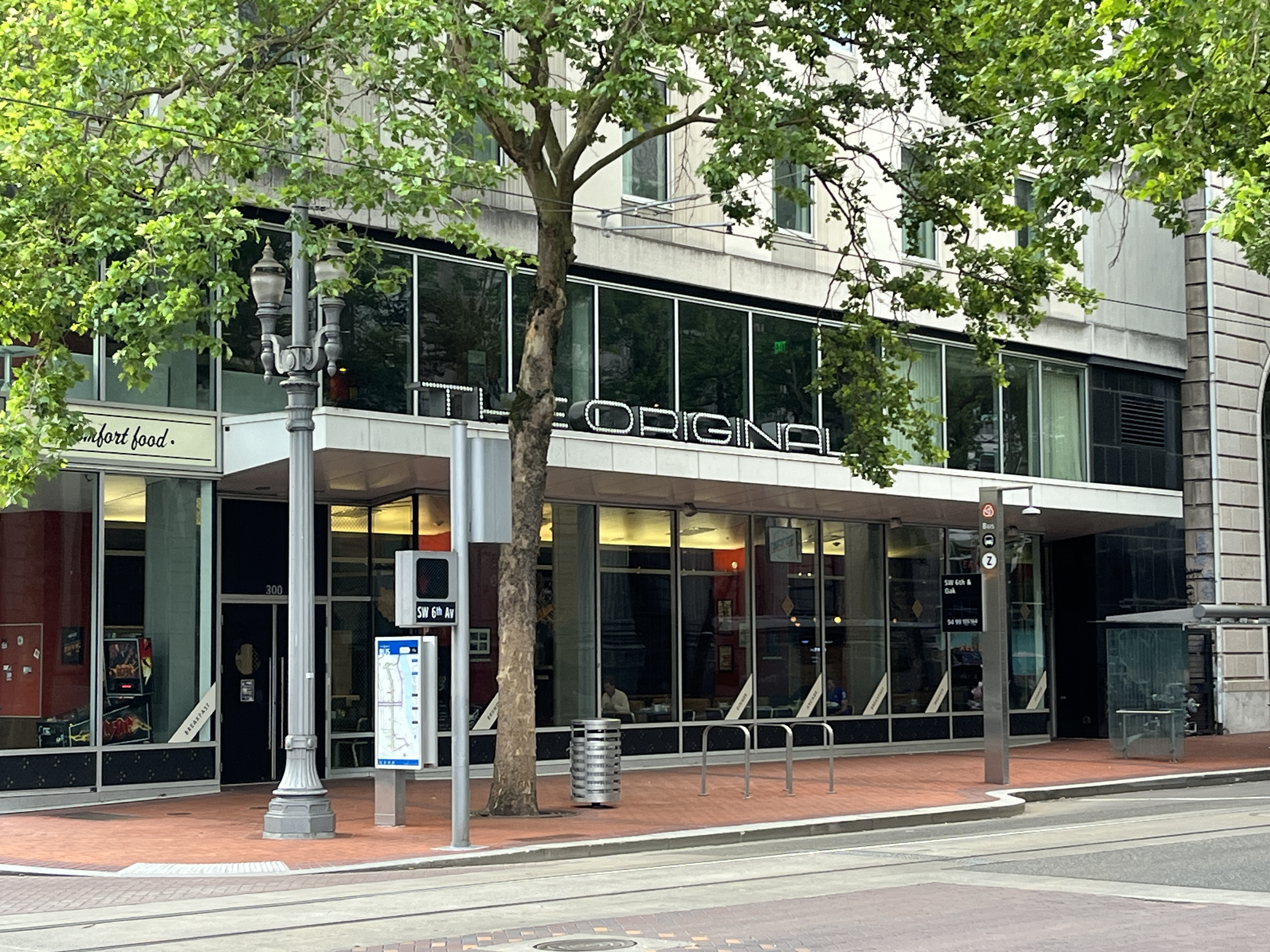
- The diner's exterior in 2023
- Interactive map of The Original Dinerant

Restaurant information
- Owner: Sage Hospitality Resources
- Head chef: Roscoe Roberson
- Pastry chef: Jeremy Intille
- Food type: American
- Location: 300 SW 6th Avenue, Portland, Multnomah, Oregon, 97204, United States
- Coordinates: 45.5215°N 122.6772°W
- Website: originaldinerant.com

The Original Dinerant, or simply The Original, was a diner serving American cuisine in Portland, Oregon, United States. Owned by Sage Hospitality Resources, Guy Fieri visited the "modern" and "upscale" diner to film a 2016 episode of the Food Network's Diners, Drive-Ins and Dives. The diner hosted competitive eating contests and other special events. The Original received a generally positive reception and was most known for its glazed doughnut sliders and alcoholic milkshakes. The restaurant's mezzanine level had an amusement arcade and bar called The Dinercade added in early 2019. The Original Dinerant closed permanently.

== Description ==
The Original Dinerant, billed as "the downtown destination for all-day Portland dining", was a diner at the intersection of Southwest Sixth Avenue and Oak Street in downtown Portland with a "retro mom-and-pop vibe", according to Eater Portland's Alex Frane. The website's Byron Beck described the restaurant as "upscale", and Matthew Korfhage of Willamette Week called it a "modern all-day diner". The diner's upstairs amusement arcade and bar was called The Dinercade which had the video arcade games Area 51 and House of the Dead, and the pinball machines Iron Maiden: Legacy of the Beast, Jurassic Park, and The Walking Dead in 2019. When the Dinercade opened in 2019, it and the Original closed at 10:00 pm on weekdays and at midnight on weekends.

=== Menu ===
The Food Network said The Original offered "creative riffs on the classics" and a "modern take on '50s and '60s diners by way of amped-up American favorites featuring local and seasonal ingredients". Korfhage said the diner's menu had "such innovations as a donut slider appetizer, a chicken-and-waffle sandwich, a croissant Monte Cristo with marionberry jam, six different $10 boozy milkshakes including a bourbon salted caramel, and a hamburger whose patty is 50% bacon". The barbecue brisket corn dog was served with fried macaroni and cheese and tomato marmalade, and the maple bacon dog comes with crêpes, fig, and ricotta, as of 2011.

The beef slider patty with cheese was served between glazed doughnut halves made in-house, and the jalapeño and cheddar buttermilk waffles came with chicken confit and maple syrup. The menu also included a turkey burger and bánh mì burger with bacon, pickled carrot and daikon, cilantro, and sriracha mayonnaise. The Crazy Burger and The Crazy Grilled Cheese were featured on the "secret" food menu in 2016; Eater Portland's Mattie John Bamman described the former as "a monumental burger made with three burgers of your choosing" and the latter as "so massive it's made by cutting a loaf of brioche toast lengthwise".

The dessert menu included the frozen blueberry peach Ice Box Cake, which had white chocolate lemon semifreddo, angel food cake, blueberries, and peaches in 2015. Varieties of alcoholic milkshakes included The Berry Boozy (vodka, vanilla ice cream, berries), The Knight Rider (Kahlúa, crème de cacao, chocolate ice cream, ground Oreo cookies), The Salty Jim (bourbon, salted caramel), banana berry, and chocolate peanut butter.

The Dinercade served snacks including caramel corn and trail mix, cocktails with names alluding to video games, beers by the can, and wine. The Princess Peach was an iced tea with bourbon whiskey and Frane described the Hadouken as a "floral and slightly sweet gin cocktail with the hue of Ryu's blue fireball".

== History ==
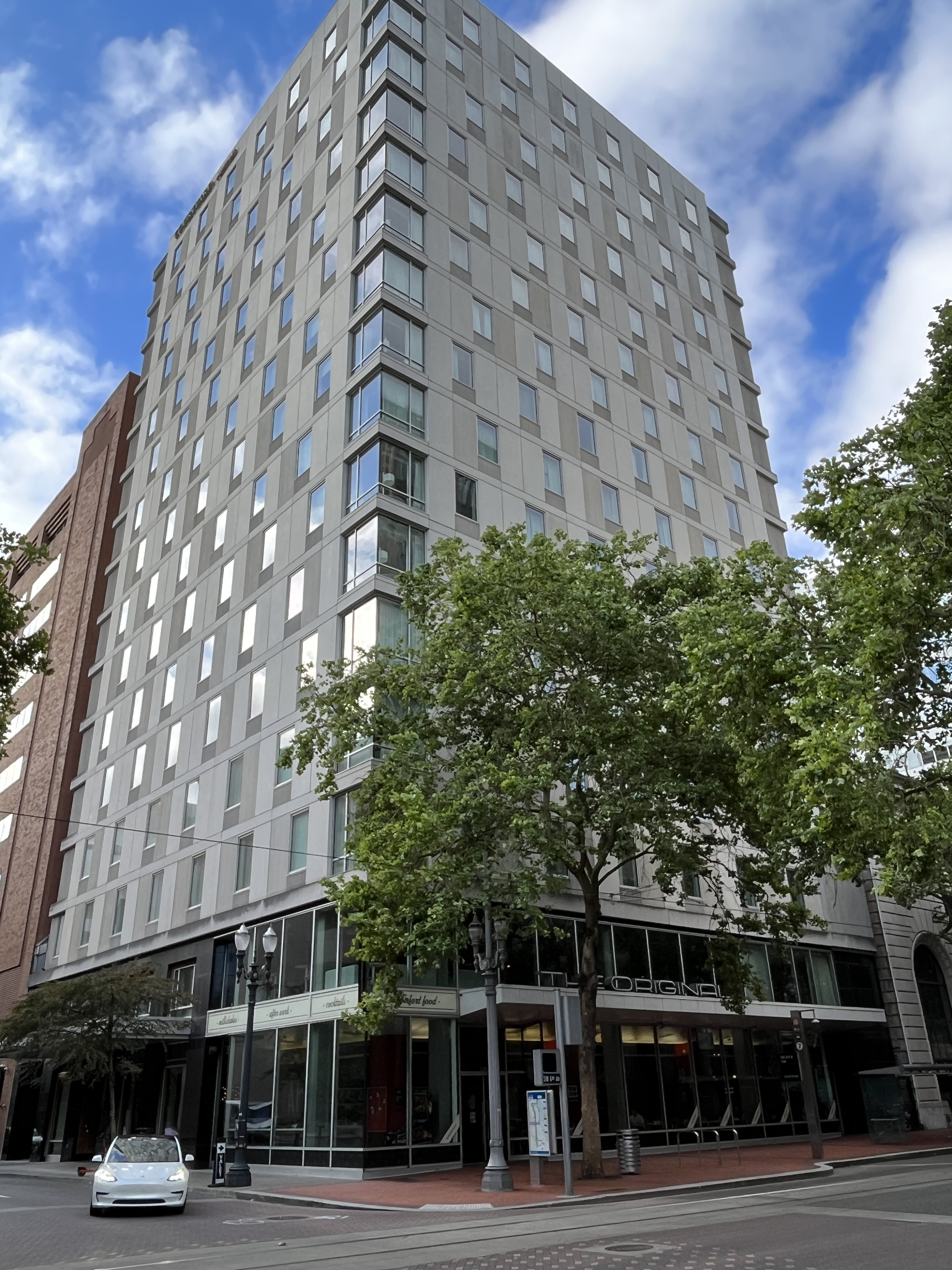
Exterior of the building which houses The Original Dinerant, 2023

The diner was owned by Sage Hospitality Resources. BJ Smith left the executive chef role in April 2011. Beck had credited Smith for "toning down" the diner's "original twisted takes on the traditional diner menu". Ryan Bleibtrey was a chef by June. David Anderson was the head chef from Fall 2013 to September 2014. AJ Voytko, who wanted to bring a more "seasonal approach" to the menu, replaced him in December.

Guy Fieri visited the restaurant for the Food Network's Diners, Drive-Ins and Dives in 2016, during Voytko's tenure. According to Eater Portland's Mattie John Bamman, Fieri's visit was prompted by the chef who had "earned a reputation for over-the-top diner classics, like a grilled cheese involving shoestring fries". Voytko's departure was announced in December 2017. Roscoe Roberson was a chef, as of November 2017.

Meaghan Goedde was the general manager in 2011, and Jeremy Intille was the pastry chef in 2015. The "secret" food menu was launched in June 2016. Specific entrees were advertised on the business' Instagram account, which patrons could then order by showing the entree to wait staff. In February 2019, the diner added a retro style arcade and bar to the upper mezzanine level with old and new arcade games and pinball machines, called The Dinercade.

The restaurant closed permanently.

=== Events ===
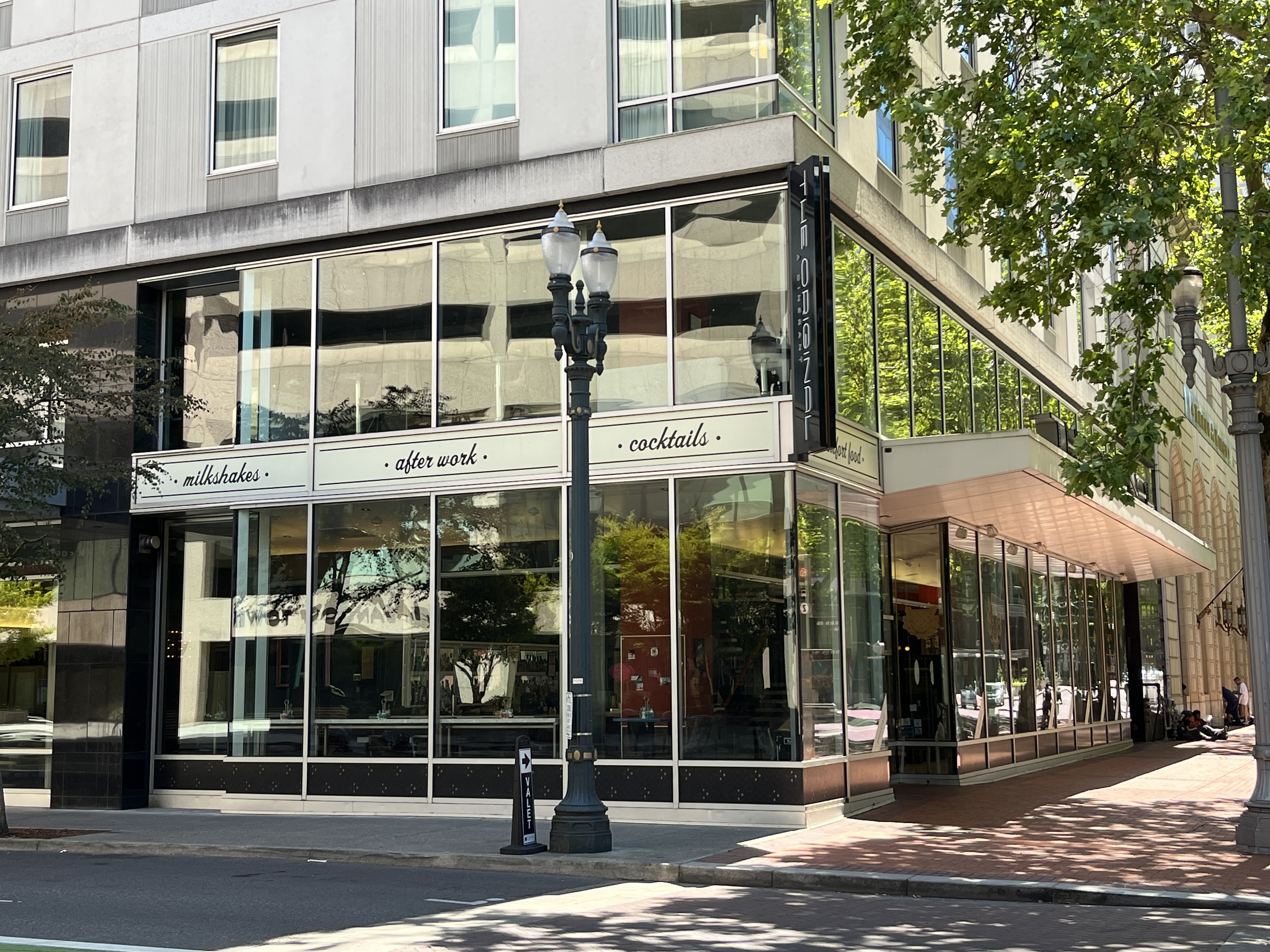
The restaurant's exterior, 2023

The restaurant hosted competitive eating contests. The annual hot dog competition challenged participants to consume as many wieners as possible within ten minutes. The event also served as a fundraiser; the third contest in 2011 benefited the Children's Hospital Travel Fund. The 2010 contest resulted in a draw, and during 2009–2010, two out of three winners were women. This prompted the name for the 2011 event to be changed to "(Wo)man vs. Dog". The "Poutine Challenge" was created in early April 2011. Participants who successfully consume 5 pounds (2,300 g) of poutine (French fries, cheese curds, and brown gravy) in 30 minutes or less earn the meal for free. Unsuccessful attempts cost participants $25; they are gifted a T-shirt for the attempt. The challenge was first completed in October 2011. The challenge was discontinued by April 2016.

The restaurant offered special menus for other events. For the "Hot Dog & Beer Dinner" special event in July 2011 commemorating Oregon Craft Beer Month, the diner served a four-course, hot dog-centered meal with beers by Astoria-based Fort George Brewery. The Original hosted the after-party for the pig cook-off known as Cochon 555 in March 2012; the event's menu included bacon apple fritters' deviled ham, smoked trout and Ritz Crackers, pork cotton candy, bacon fudge, and pork soda. For Thanksgiving in 2017, a prix-fixe menu included turkey, glazed ham or confit portobello mushroom and squash, a green or Caesar salad, and chess, bourbon-pecan or pumpkin pie for dessert.

== Reception ==
Fieri called the chicken and waffles "another standout". Shana Lynch of Delish.com included The Salty Jim on her 2016 list of the thirteen "most insane freakshakes" in the United States, calling the drink "one that you won't want to miss". In her 2017 overview of twenty-one "great Portland restaurants that take reservations for bruch", Samantha Bakall of The Oregonian wrote, "Downtown Portland's modern diner, The Original is often more known for their boozy shakes and quick cocktails than slick brunch reservations. On weekend mornings, build your own burger, make your own chicken and waffles or stick to the classics with chicken fried steak." The newspaper's Olivia Dimmer wrote in her 2017 overview of Portland's ice cream options, "If Yelp reviews are an indication of a good boozy milkshake, The Original is the spot to be for a grown-up version of the summertime treat. With flavors like bourbon salted caramel and maple bacon, how can you go wrong?" Lizzy Acker of The Oregonian called the glazed doughnut sliders "out of control" in her 2018 overview of "food-type things that are really only for Instagram". In a 2019 overview of downtown Portland's happy hours, one Portland Mercury contributor wrote:

I'm a big fan of the Original for pancake-y brunching and big-burger lunching. As for their happy hour? Well, their comfort food steez doesn't always translate well to after-work drinks and bites. For example, donut burger sliders are just too whimsical for me. And while their poutine, ladled with gravy and cheese curds, doesn't exactly sing, their meatloaf sliders are a yummy cardiac arrest. Happy hour drinks are limited to a couple of wines, alcoholic milkshakes and floats, and a 'daily punch'—mine was a rum and pineapple, which was okay. Their happy hour seems like an afterthought, so maybe stick to lunching/brunching instead.

In his 2019 review of The Dinercade, Willamette Week's Pete Cottell said the "half-cooked imitation of Ground Kontrol" offers "casual fun for small groups who just want something to do with their hands in between sips of one of the Original's trademark boozy milkshakes". He considered the pinball variety limited, writing, "you'll mostly find bad sequels to shooters ... in place of their popular originals, which made us wonder whether the cabinets were consciously hand-selected by someone who didn't know better or simply part of a package deal when a like-minded operation failed to sniff any success when offered their availability". Cottell complimented The Original for making "some of the best stoner food you can find in the neighborhood", but opined:

Unfortunately for the Original Dinerant, the upright [pinball] cabinets tend to be too glitchy, slow-moving or just plain outdated, which means even the average player will seek out reliably working coin-operated entertainment elsewhere... The occasional Diners, Drive-Ins and Dives tourist may be too stoked about entering Flavortown to care that the gun on the bar's first-person shooter is buggy and won't kill any zombies or raptors. Beyond that, the Original should consider hitting the reset button."

Zagat gave the diner ratings of 4.6 for food, 4.5 for decor, and 4.4 for service, each on a scale of 5. The guide said:

A menu to suit any palate lures a Downtown crowd to this nouveau diner slinging affordable classics inspired by seasonal, local ingredients plus a few oddities that'll make you smile (e.g. Fruit Loops pancakes); the super-cool, modern bi-level space is outfitted with booths, counter seating and a bar dispensing housemade sodas plus cocktails, beer and wine."

== See also ==
- List of defunct restaurants of the United States
- List of diners
- List of Diners, Drive-Ins and Dives episodes
