= Modera =

Modera may refer to:

- Modera House, a stately home in Colombo, Sri Lanka
- Hotel Zags Portland, a hotel in Portland, Oregon previously known as Hotel Modera

== See also ==
- Modara, a municipal ward of Colombo
- Moderna, an American pharmaceutical company
- Modena, a city in Italy
- Madeira, an autonomous region of Portugal
- Modern (disambiguation)
