= Carpendale =

Carpendale may refer to

== People ==
- Maxwell Carpendale (1865–1941), an Irish rugby international
- Charles Douglas Carpendale (1874–1968), a Royal Navy admiral and BBC executive
- Howard Carpendale (born 1946), a South African singer
- Sheelagh Carpendale, a Canadian artist and computer scientist

== Places ==
- Carpendale, Queensland
- Carpendale, West Virginia

== See also ==
- Carbondale, Illinois
