= Nel Centro =

Defunct restaurant in Portland, Oregon, U.S.

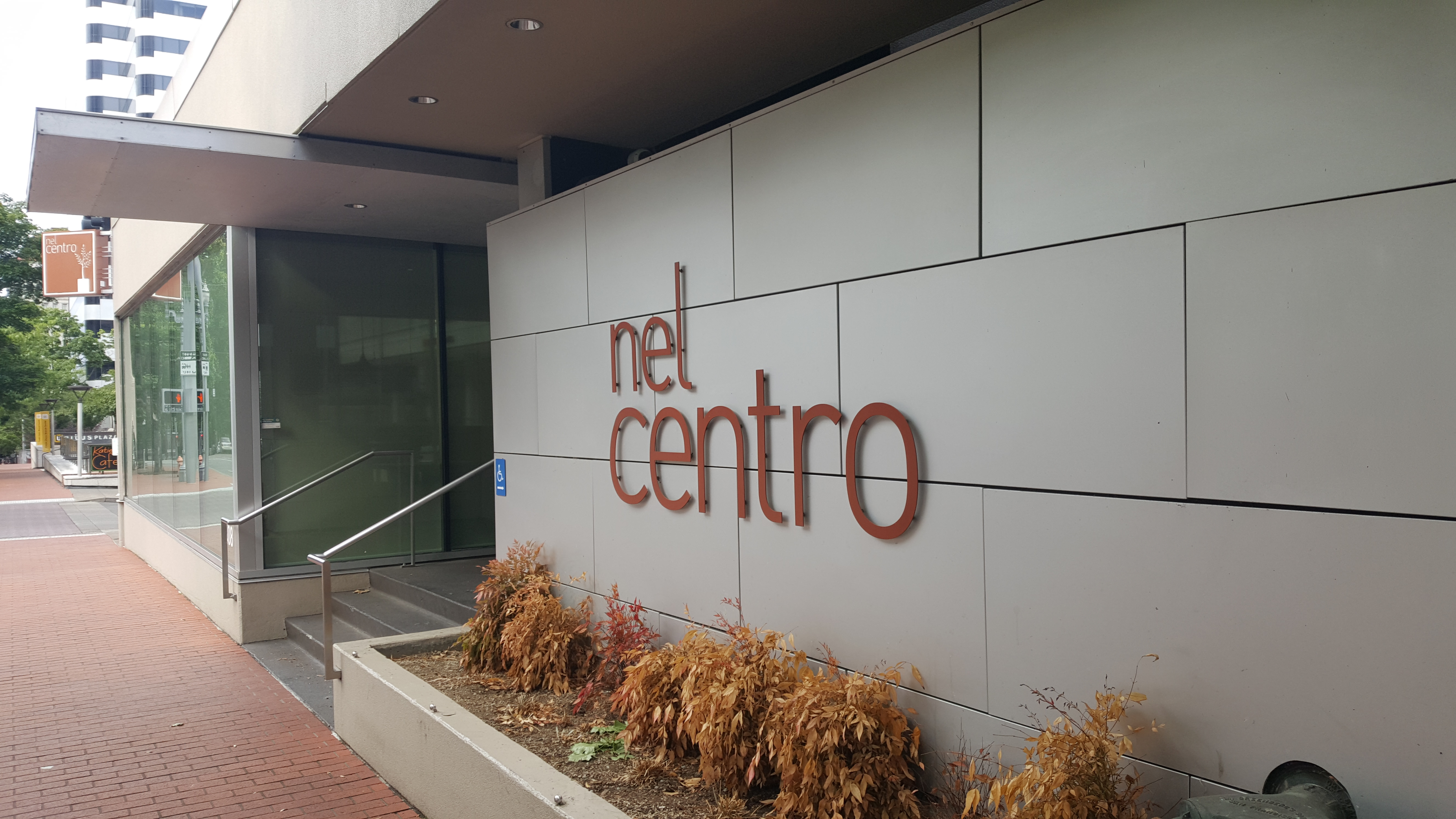
- Entrance, 2020
- Interactive map of Nel Centro

Restaurant information
- Established: 2009
- Closed: May 2020
- Location: Portland, Oregon
- Coordinates: 45.5142°N 122.6809°W

Nel Centro was a restaurant in downtown Portland, Oregon. The restaurant opened in 2009 and closed in 2020, during the COVID-19 pandemic.

== History ==
The restaurant opened in 2009. Baker Lee Posey left in 2009. John Eisenhart became executive chef in 2015. In 2020, chef and restaurateur David Machado closed Nel Centro and his four other Portland restaurants permanently, including Altabira City Tavern, during the COVID-19 pandemic. The restaurant PLS on Sixth, which is a second location of San Francisco's PLS on Post, began operating in the space in May 2025.

== See also ==
- COVID-19 pandemic in Portland, Oregon
- Impact of the COVID-19 pandemic on the restaurant industry in the United States
