= Fort Rapids =

Defunct hotel and water park in Columbus, Ohio

Fort Rapids Indoor Waterpark Resort
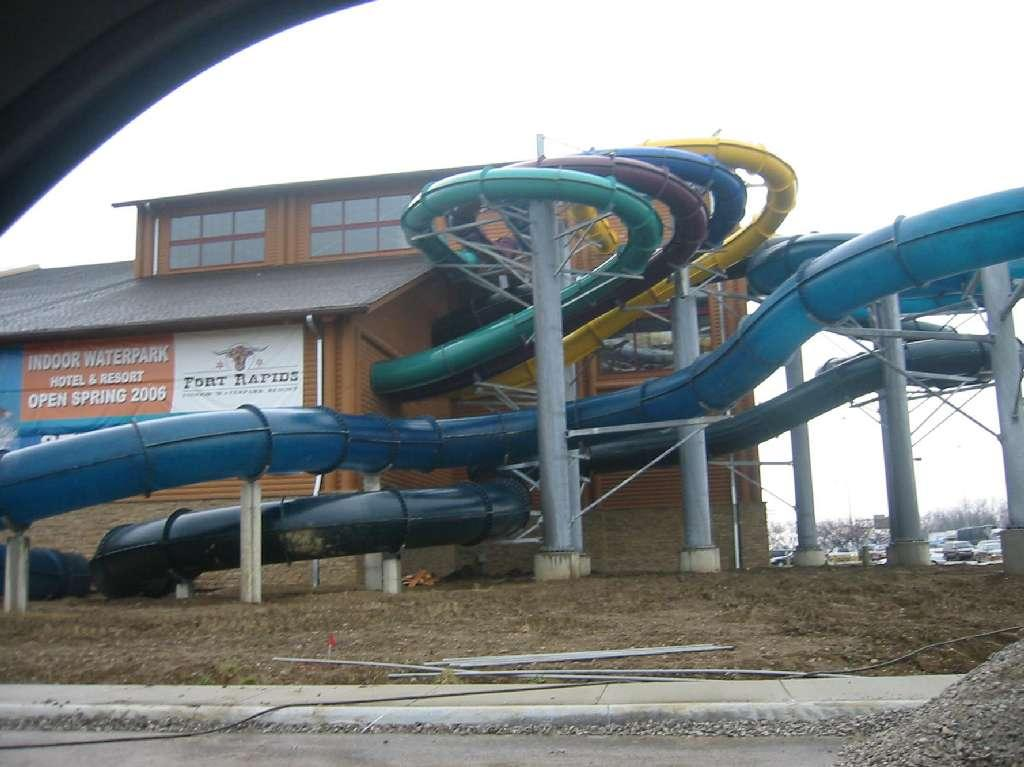

General information
- Location: 4560 Hilton Corporate Drive; Columbus, Ohio
- Opening: May 22, 2006; 20 years ago
- Closed: February 21, 2016; 10 years ago
- Owner: New Perspective Asset Management

Other information
- Number of suites: 338

Website
- Archived 2016-03-05 at the Wayback Machine

Fort Rapids was a family resort built for middle class families located in Columbus, Ohio. It was the largest indoor water park resort in Ohio until its closure in 2016.

== History ==
Fort Rapids was constructed alongside the existing Holiday Inn Columbus East hotel. The hotel was renovated as part of the project. It opened in 2006.

Experience Hospitality assumed management of the hotel in February 2016. On February 21, 2016, a small fire occurred and damaged electrical panels, and the resort temporarily closed due to a history of health code violations under its previous ownership. The following day, the hotel was ordered to close by the Columbus Police Department within the next week due to numerous code violations.

In January 2018, a water pipe burst on the upper floors of the hotel, leading to ice forming on the exterior walls. In 2022, the city of Columbus decided to fine Fort Rapids $1,000 per day.

In March 2023, the owner of the hotel, Jeff Kern, pleaded no contest to four non-compliance counts related to Fort Rapids during a jury trial in Midland, Michigan.

On June 18, 2024, Jeff Kern was held in contempt of court and ordered to pay a $199,000 contempt fine and $2,000 daily penalties until the property was compliant with safety codes. The city of Columbus required Kern to submit a rehabilitation plan and proof of funding by August 1. After Kern failed to attend a court-ordered compliance hearing that day, without having submitted a plan or proof of funding, the city ordered Kern's arrest.

In October 2024, a fire started in the hotel overnight and took hours for the Columbus Fire Department to control. The fire left a large hole on the property's roof, and caused significant structural damage to part of the property that would require demolition. On December 9, the city issued a sua sponte order allowing New Perspective Asset Management to immediately take over management of the property.

== See also ==
- CoCo Key Water Resort
