= Isenburg =

Isenburg may refer to:

== Places ==
- Neu-Isenburg, town in the district of Offenbach in Hesse, Germany
- Isenburg, Rhineland-Palatinate, municipality in the district of Neuwied, Germany
- Isenburg (Wipperfürth), village in the borough of Wipperfürth in Oberbergischen Kreis in North Rhine-Westphalia, Germany
- Isenburg (Horb), village in the borough of Horb in the district of Freudenstadt, Baden-Württemberg, Germany

== Territories, castles and palaces ==
- County of Isenburg, a territorial lordship that was ruled by the lords, counts and princes of Isenburg
- Isenburg (Hattingen), castle near Hattingen in North Rhine-Westphalia, Germany
- Isenburg (Köln), castle in Cologne, Germany
- Isenburg (Stammburg), castle in Isenburg near Dierdorf in the Westerwald forest, Germany
- Neue Isenburg, castle near Essen in North Rhine-Westphalia, Germany
- Isenburg (Saxony), castle between Hartenstein and Wildbach, Germany
- Isenburg Castle in Offenbach am Main, Germany
- Isenburg (Landringhausen), former circular rampart site near Landringhausen, borough of Barsinghausen, Germany

== People ==
- a Rhenish aristocratic family, see County of Isenburg
- Anna von Isenburg (1460–1522), German noblewoman
- Arnold II of Isenburg (died 1259), Archbishop of Trier
- Diether von Isenburg (1412–1482), German priest, Archbishop of Mainz (1459–1462 and 1475–1482)
- Ernst Graf von Isenburg (1584-1664), Spanish general in the Thirty Years' War
- Helene Elisabeth von Isenburg (1900–1974), President of the Stille Hilfe relief organisation
- Wilhelm Karl Prinz zu Isenburg (1903–1956), German genealogist

== See also ==
- Isenburg-Büdingen, a former county of southern Hesse, Germany
- Isenberg (disambiguation)
