= Hotel Zags Portland =

Hotel in Portland, Oregon, U.S.

The Hotel Zags
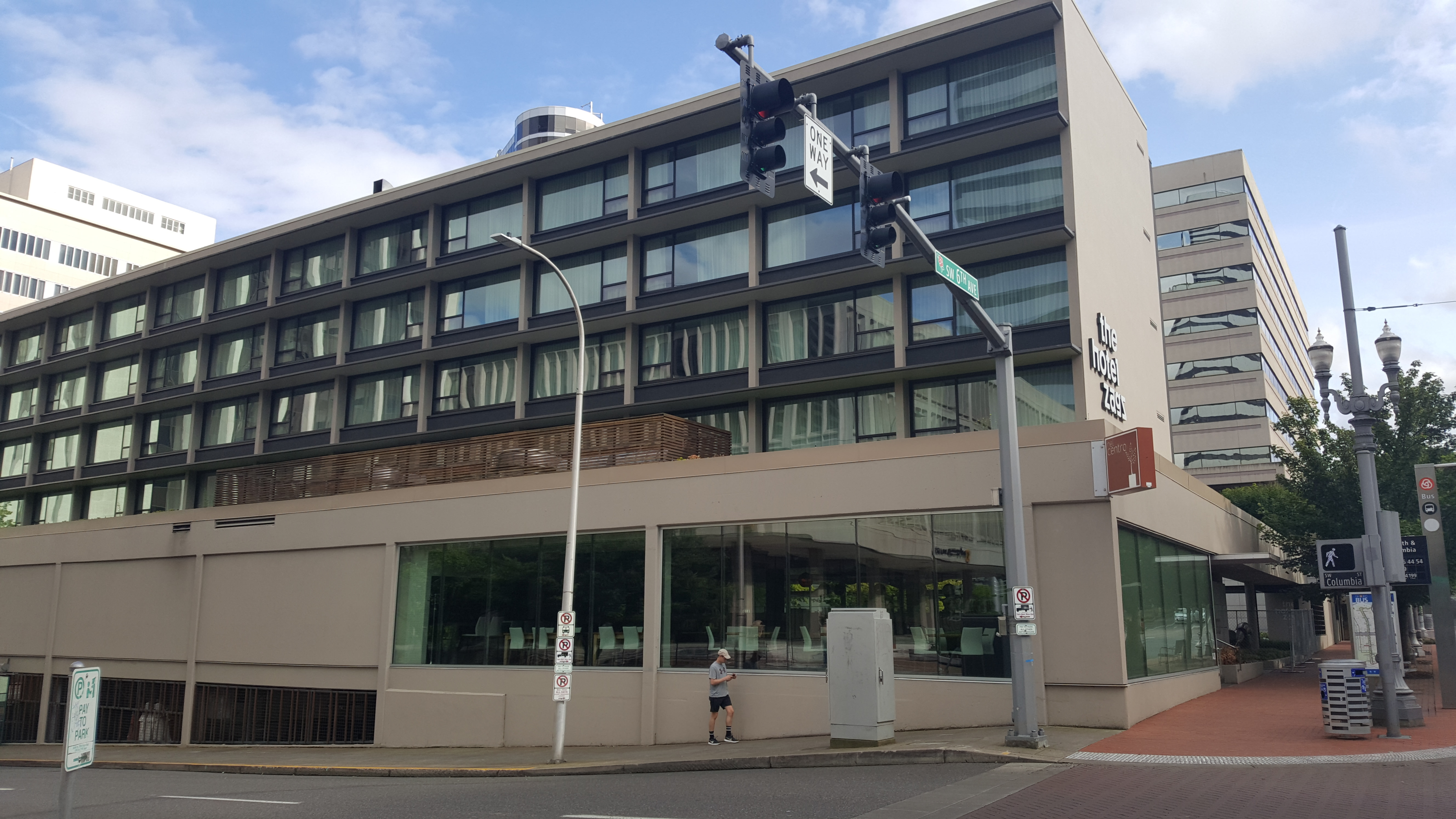
- The hotel's exterior, 2020
- Interactive map of the The Hotel Zags area
- Former names: Hotel Modera, Portland Motor Hotel, Days Inn Portland

General information
- Location: Portland, Oregon, U.S., 515 SW Clay St. Portland, OR, 97201
- Coordinates: 45°30′50″N 122°40′50.5″W

Website
- https://www.thehotelzags.com/

The Hotel Zags Portland is a hotel in Portland, Oregon. The hotel previously operated as Portland Motor Hotel and Hotel Modera.

The hotel has 174 rooms.

The restaurant PLS on Sixth, a second location of San Francisco's PLS on Post, began operating in the hotel on May 22, 2025, in the space previously occupied by Nel Centro.
