= Johann Ludwig Krapf =

German missionary and explorer

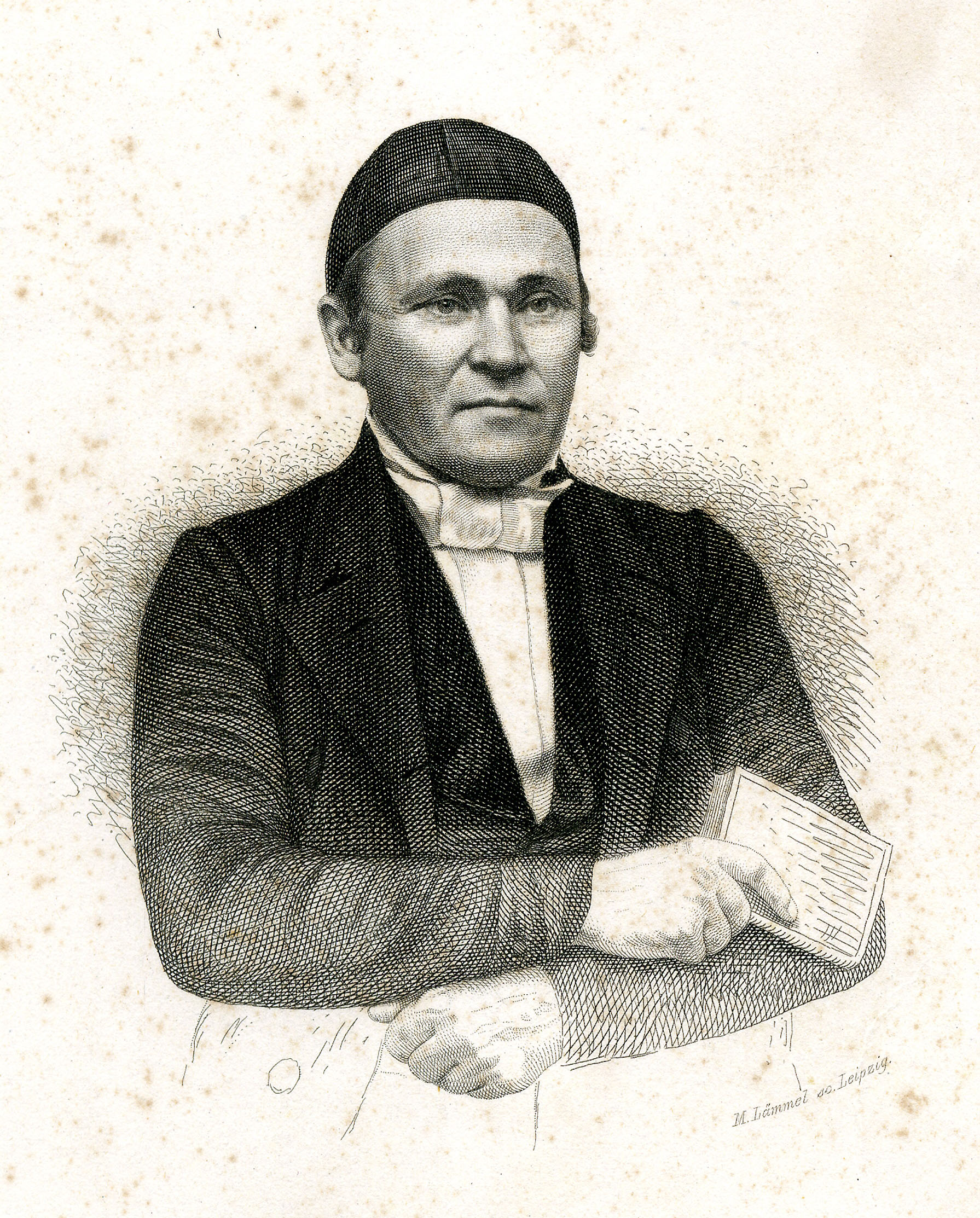
- Born: 11 January 1810; Tübingen-Derendingen, Kingdom of Württemberg
- Died: 26 November 1881 (aged 71); Korntal, German Empire
- Occupation: Christian Missionary

Johann Ludwig Krapf (11 January 1810 – 26 November 1881) was a German missionary in East Africa, as well as an explorer, linguist, and traveller. Krapf played an important role in exploring East Africa with Johannes Rebmann. They were the first Europeans to see Mount Kenya, with the help of Akamba, who dwelled at its slopes, and Kilimanjaro.

Ludwig Krapf visited Ukambani, the homeland of the Kamba people, in 1849 and again in 1850. He successfully translated the New Testament to the Kamba language. Krapf also played a key role in exploring the East African coastline, especially in Mombasa.

== Early life ==
Krapf was born into a Lutheran family of farmers in southwest Germany. From his school days onward he developed his gift for languages. He initially studied Latin, Greek, French and Italian. More languages were to follow throughout his life. After finishing school he joined the Basel Mission Seminary at age 17 but discontinued his studies as he had doubts about his missionary vocation. He studied theology at University of Tübingen and graduated in 1834. While working as an assistant village pastor, he met a Basel missionary, Peter Fjellstedt, who encouraged him to resume his missionary vocation.

== Ethiopia ==
In 1836 he was invited by the Anglican Church Missionary Society (CMS) to join their work in Ethiopia. Basel Mission seconded him to the Anglicans and from 1837 to 1842 he worked in this ancient Christian land. He prepared himself by learning ancient Ge'ez and the Amharic language of the Ethiopian Highlands. Landing at Tadjura, Krapf followed the trade route to Shewa, where he presented himself to its ruler, Meridazmach Sahle Selassie, and later accompanied the Meridazmach on a military campaign in southern Shewa. Krapf's pietist background did not help him much to understand and appreciate traditional Ethiopian Christianity, especially their emphasis on saints, liturgy and use of Ge'ez, a language no longer spoken. When he departed Shewa in 1842, he found his way to Gondar blocked by the aftermath of the Battle of Debre Tabor, retraced his steps to the court of Adara Bille, a chieftain of the Wollo Oromo who then robbed him. Krapf managed to effect his escape with his servants, and made his way to Massawa supported by the reluctant charity of the local inhabitants.

Thus he centred his interest on the Oromo people of southern Ethiopia, in his time known as the Galla, who then were largely believers in a traditional religion. He learned their language and started translating parts of the New Testament into it. While 1842 saw Krapf receive a doctorate from University of Tübingen for his research into the Ethiopian languages, it also witnessed the expulsion of all Western missionaries from Ethiopia, which ended his work there. In association with his colleague, Carl Wilhelm Isenberg, he published a memoir of his time in Ethiopia, Journals of Isenberg and Krapf in 1843. He revised Abu Rumi's Bible translations into Amharic for BFBS.

== Kenya ==
Krapf spent some time in Alexandria, Egypt, where he married. From there he set off for East Africa hoping to reach the Oromo from what is now the Kenyan coast. Most of the East African coastline was then part of the Zanzibar sultanate. Sultan Sayyid Said gave him a permit to start a missionary station at the coastal city of Mombasa. Krapf started again by learning the languages of the local Mijikenda people and also Swahili which is an East African lingua franca language of communication.

Soon after arrival in Mombasa his wife and young daughter suffered and died from malaria. Krapf moved to the higher grounds of Rabai on the coastal hills and started his station New Rabai (Rabai Mpya). Here he wrote the first dictionary and grammar of the Swahili language. He also started studying other African languages, drafting dictionaries and translating sections of the Bible. Working with a Muslim judge named Ali bin Modehin, he translated Genesis. He went on to translate the New Testament, as well as the Book of Common Prayer. However, most of this was unpublished, though it was later used in revising a translation in a more southern version of Swahili.

In 1846 he was joined by Johannes Rebmann, another southwest German Lutheran who was in the service of the CMS. Krapf and Rebmann set off to explore the interior of East Africa and they were the first Europeans to see the snowcapped mountains of Kilimanjaro and Mount Kenya. They sent reports about them to Europe which were ridiculed by the experts.

Krapf's deteriorating health forced him to return to Germany in 1853. He brought with him several old Swahili manuscripts, including copies of the Book of the Battle of Tambuka, the earliest Swahili manuscript. In Korntal he continued his linguistic studies and advisory work for the Christian missions.

== Krapf's legacy ==
- The Anglican Church of Kenya counts him as its founding father.
- Linguists have been drawing on his works as he studied languages as diverse as Ge'ez, Amharic, Oromo, Swahili, Kamba, Mijikenda and Maasai language.
- His house at New Rabai is now part of Rabai Museum, one of the National Museums of Kenya. The building of the German Embassy at Nairobi is called "Ludwig-Krapf-House".
- In his home town of Tübingen-Derendingen there is an elementary school that bears his name.

== Bibliography (selection) ==
- Vocabulary of the Galla Language. London 1842.
- Vocabulary of six East African languages. Kiswahili, Kinika, Kikamba, Kipokomo, Kihiau, Kigalla. Tübingen 1850.
- Outline of the elements of the Kisuaheli Language, with special reference to the Kinika Dialect. Tübingen 1850.
- Reisen in Ostafrika, ausgeführt in den Jahren 1837 - 1855. Unveränderter Nachdruck der Ausgabe Stuttgart, Stroh 1858. Mit einer Einführung hrsg. von Werner Raupp, Münster. Berlin 1994 (= Afrikanische Reisen 2).
- The Books of the Old Testament. Translation in Amharic Language., 3 Bände, London 1871–73.
- Dictionary of the Suahili Language. London 1882.

== Sources and further reading ==
- Eber, Jochen: Johann Ludwig Krapf: ein schwäbischer Pionier in Ostafrika. 2006
- Gütl, Clemens. Johann Ludwig Krapf - "Do' Missionar vo' Deradenga" zwischen pietistischem Ideal und afrikanischer Realität (Beiträge zur Missionswissenschaft und interkulturellen Theologie, Bd. 17). Hamburg 2001.
- Gütl, Clemens. Johann Ludwig Krapf's "Memoir on the East African Slave Trade" - Ein unveröffentlichtes Dokument aus dem Jahr 1853. With introduction edited by Clemens Gütl (Beiträge zur Afrikanistik, vol. 73), Wien 2002.
- Kretzmann, Paul E. (no date, author 1883–1955) John Ludwig Krapf: The Explorer-Missionary of Northeastern Africa. Columbus, Ohio: The Book Concern.
- Raupp, Werner: Gelebter Glaube. Metzingen/Württemberg 1993, pp. 278–287: "Johann Ludwig Krapf - Bahnbrecher der ostafrikanischen Mission".
- Raupp, Werner: Johann Ludwig Krapf. Missionar, Forschungsreisender und Sprachforscher (1810–1881). In: Lebensbilder aus Baden-Württemberg, vol. 22. Ed. by Gerhard Taddey and Rainer Brüning, Stuttgart 2007, pp. 182–226.
- Raupp, Werner: Johann Ludwig Krapf, "dr Missionar vo Deradinga". In: Hin und weg. Tübingen in aller Welt. Ed. by Karlheinz Wiegmann. Tübingen 2007 (Tübinger Kataloge, 77), S. (90) - 99.
- Raupp, Werner: Morgenroth des Reiches Gottes. In: Tübinger Blätter 96 (2010), pp. 70–73.

== External links and sources ==
- Works by or about Johann Ludwig Krapf at the Internet Archive
- Karl Knauß (1992). "Krapf, Johann Ludwig". In Bautz, Traugott (ed.). Biographisch-Bibliographisches Kirchenlexikon (BBKL) (in German). Vol. 4. Herzberg: Bautz. cols. 606–608. ISBN 3-88309-038-7.
- Krapf's life and works
- Kretzmann, Paul E., John Ludwig Krapf: The Explorer-Missionary of Northeastern Africa at Internet Archive
- 1882 bio of Krapf
- Kraft at the web site of the Evangelische Kirche Württemberg
- More pictures of J.L. Krapf
