= The American West =

American television documentary series

- Also known as: The West
- Genre: Docuseries
- Written by: Brian Burstein; John Ealer; Zachary Herrmann; Steve Loh; Jeremiah Murphy; Jordan Rosenblum; David Schaye
- Directed by: John Ealer
- Narrated by: Bert Thomas Morris
- Country of origin: United States
- Original language: English
- No. of seasons: 1
- No. of episodes: 8

Production
- Executive producers: Robert Redford; Stephen David; Laura Michalchyshyn; Tim W. Kelly; Shirley Escott
- Producers: Brian Burstein; Zachary Herrmann; Petra Hoebel; Jordan Rosenblum
- Production locations: Utah; West Virginia
- Cinematography: Kevin M. Graves
- Editors: Tim W. Kelly; John Kilgour; Jonathan Soule; Wyatt Rogowski; Christopher Martini; Neal Usatin
- Production companies: Sundance Productions; Stephen David Entertainment; AMC Studios

Original release
- Network: AMC
- Release: June 11 – July 30, 2016

The American West (formerly titled The West) is a limited-event American television docu-series detailing the history of the Western United States in the period from 1865 to 1890. The series was executively produced by Robert Redford, Stephen David and Laura Michalchyshyn with Sundance Productions and aired for eight episodes on AMC from June 11 to July 30, 2016.

As of June 2021, the series was streaming on Amazon Prime Video in some countries.

== Overview ==
Following the American Civil War, the United States begins developing into the "land of opportunity," despite the danger from cowboys, Native Americans, outlaws and lawmen. The series chronicles the stories of Western legends, such as Jesse James, Billy the Kid, Wyatt Earp, George Armstrong Custer, Crazy Horse and Sitting Bull.

== Production ==
Produced and distributed by Sundance Productions, the series features exclusive interviews with notable names from classic Western films, including Robert Redford, James Caan, Burt Reynolds, Tom Selleck, Kiefer Sutherland, Mark Harmon, and Ed Harris.

The series was to be initially aired on Discovery Channel, but was changed to AMC and retooled in 2014. Production on the series began in August 2015, following AMC's ordering it straight to series.

Filming for the series was predominantly done in West Virginia's Berkeley and Jefferson counties, as well as Prickett's Fort State Park in Marion County.

== Cast ==
=== Main ===
- David H. Stevens as Jesse James
- Derek Chariton as Billy the Kid
- Will Strongheart as Crazy Horse
- John C. Bailey as General George Custer
- Moses Brings Plenty as Sitting Bull
- Jonathan C. Stewart as Wyatt Earp

=== Supporting ===
- Morgan Lund as Ulysses S. Grant
- Michael Marunde as William T. Sherman
- Eric Rolland as Thomas C. Durant
- Joseph Carlson as Frank James
- Ric Maddox as Pat Garrett
- Hugh Scully as Allen Pinkerton
- Nicholas Bialis as Morgan Earp
- Sean Brown as Cole Younger

== Interview subjects ==
The series features several interviews from authors, celebrities, historians and political figures.

- Mark Lee Gardener – author, Shot All to Hell
- David Eisenbach – historian, Columbia University
- Kiefer Sutherland – actor, Young Guns
- Eric Foner – historian, Columbia University
- H.W. Brands – historian, University of Texas at Austin
- Danny Glover – actor, Silverado
- Walter R. Borneman – author, Iron Horses
- Paul Hutton, historian – University of New Mexico
- Andrew C. Isenberg – author, Wyatt Earp: A Vigilante Life
- Karl Jacoby – historian, Columbia University
- Anne Collier – curator, Edmund C. Jaeger Cultural & Natural History Museum
- Burt Reynolds – actor, Gunsmoke
- Robert Redford – actor, Butch Cassidy and the Sundance Kid
- Bill Richardson – former governor of New Mexico
- Larry T. Pourier – Oglala Lakota Filmmaker
- John McCain – U.S. Senator, Arizona
- Kathleen Chamberlain – author, In the Shadow of Billy the Kid
- Ann Kirschner – author, Lady at the O.K. Corral
- Mark Harmon – actor, Wyatt Earp
- Tom Selleck – actor, Quigley Down Under
- John Morey – historian
- Ed Harris – actor, Appaloosa

== Reception ==
Robert Lloyd of the Los Angeles Times compared the series to others in the genre: "What's fresh in this retelling...is the degree to which it has gone in for re-creation as opposed to documentation, and the fact that it has drafted movie cowboys." He added "it's more dress-up than drama, more reenactment than documentary."

Rob Lowman of the Los Angeles Daily News called the series "more entertainment than insightful." He added "The American West doesn't dig into the ramifications of transformation of the West, preferring to keep skipping through history."

== Episodes ==
No.	Title	Original release date	US viewers (millions)
1	"America Divided"	June 11, 2016	1.45
Prior to the end the American Civil War, Jesse James joins the Quantrill's Raiders. He is shot, captured and forced to swear loyalty to the Union. Upon his release and return home, he must rob and steal to provide for his mother. He and his brother, Frank, form a gang with other former Confederates, stealing from the Union whenever possible and robbing banks. Widespread riots erupt, and the government seeks westward expansion to appease the people. Land is given to railroad companies, who sell it to settlers. However, some of the land is already occupied by Native American tribes willing to fight for it. One such tribe, the Lakota, has warrior Crazy Horse to lead the resistance. An early skirmish causes over 100 U.S. Army fatalities, and George Armstrong Custer is sent into battle.
2	"Two Front War"	June 18, 2016	1.20
Custer's troops attack a Cheyenne camp in what will become known as the Washita Massacre. President Ulysses S. Grant seeks peace with the natives by proposing to move them to reservations. Sioux leaders Crazy Horse and Sitting Bull tentatively agree to the accord. Upon later learning of gold on Sioux land, Grant sends Custer to locate it and report back. Custer finds it but announces it to the press, and miners encroach upon the Black Hills, a violation of a peace treaty. The First transcontinental railroad completes its spanning the country, but an investigation reveals railroad baron Thomas C. Durant's corruption. The nation ultimately plummets into economic depression, but not before Jesse James sees the railroad as a new way to make money off Northerners and begins robbing trains. Confederate journalist John Newman Edwards starts publishing the train robbery stories, elevating Jesse to hero status. The railroad companies call upon Allan Pinkerton to put an end to the train robberies.
3	"Blood & Gold"	June 25, 2016	1.07
James Witcher is sent by Pinkerton to find and disband the James gang. Witcher meets Zerelda, mother of Frank and Jesse, who leads him to a barn where Frank strangles him to death. Pinkerton then leads a raid, which destroys the family home, causes the death of 8-year-old Archie and injures Zerelda. Meanwhile, President Grant offers to buy back the Black Hills from the Sioux, who refuse. In response, Grant announces that all natives must report to reservations or be considered "hostile". Sitting Bull and Crazy Horse decide they would rather die like warriors than submit. General William T. Sherman tells Grant to deploy Custer to deal with the growing Indian threat. After hearing reports of the approaching army, Sitting Bull tells the Indian leaders of a vision, and they prepare for battle. Custer learns nearly 4,000 Indian warriors have amassed, yet he marches with only 500 men and no heavy artillery to Little Bighorn.
4	"Showdown"	July 2, 2016	1.08
Custer's army is nearly wiped out by the Sioux, and he is killed while taking aim at Sitting Bull. After the victory, Sitting Bull fears that the white man will never rest. Meanwhile, the James–Younger Gang attempts a bank robbery in Northfield, Minnesota. The enraged townspeople form posses of more than 1,000 men and pursue them. The James Brothers go into hiding. A close presidential race between Samuel J. Tilden and Rutherford B. Hayes results in a compromise that Southerners will elect Hayes if the Army pulls out of the South, effectively ending reconstruction and federal protection of the rights of freed slaves. General Sherman employs total warfare against the Sioux, while the military pays hunters to massacre buffalo in an attempt to starve the Indians. William "Buffalo Bill" Cody takes down 4,000 buffalo himself; and the entire population drops from 60 million buffalo to less than two thousand within a century. Crazy Horse and Sitting Bull debate moving to Canada.
5	"Outlaw Rising"	July 9, 2016	1.19
With starvation increasing, Sitting Bull leads 5,000 of his people to Canada, while Crazy Horse remains with 1,000. Crazy Horse also allows white settlers into the Black Hills. In Nebraska, he demands a place for his people to start a new life, as promised in the government treaty. This is viewed as an uprising, and he is then lured into a trap and killed. In New Mexico, Billy the Kid steals cattle to survive from a rancher, John Tunstall, who captures him but later hires him and becomes his mentor. When cattle barons engineer the murder of Tunstall, Billy swears vengeance on those responsible, including the corrupt Sheriff William J. Brady, thus escalating the Lincoln County War. Meanwhile in Kansas, Wyatt Earp is recruited as deputy marshal in Dodge City.
6	"The Big Killing"	July 16, 2016	1.21
In Dodge City, Wyatt Earp patrols the streets. He averages around 300 arrests a month, but he becomes outraged when actress Dora Hand's killer walks free after local officials are paid off by the killer's father. Elsewhere, Billy the Kid forms the vigilante Regulators to avenge John Tunstall's murder. Sheriff Brady is their first target; five other men are also pursued and killed. Billy manages to escape a group from the U.S. Army and others to flee to Las Vegas, New Mexico. Meanwhile, Jesse James is tired of laying low; his brother is not. Jesse takes out solo and crosses paths with Billy, who turns down the offer to work with him. The new Lincoln County sheriff, Pat Garrett, is tasked with tracking Billy. He finds him in a hideout and forces him to surrender.
7	"Frontier Justice"	July 23, 2016	1.12
After being sentenced to hang for killing Sheriff Brady, Billy kills two deputies and escapes imprisonment. Wyatt and his brothers hear of the silver mining boom in Tombstone, Arizona, but arrive to find that claims on the best areas have been made. Local businesses ask them to be lawmen to protect their town. In 1881, a Wells Fargo stagecoach is robbed, and they set out to find those involved; Wyatt enlists the help of his friend, Doc Holliday. Ike Clanton, promised a $3,600 bounty by Earp, names the robbers, but they are killed elsewhere in an unrelated incident and Earp refuses to pay Clanton the promised reward. Elsewhere, Sitting Bull leads his people back into America and its reservation housing. He then joins Buffalo Bill in his tours across the country. Jesse James's rebuilt renown grows as he continues robbing trains, but the bounty on him makes him paranoid, forcing him to hide with the Ford Brothers. Garrett tracks Billy to Fort Sumner, New Mexico and kills him. Clanton vows to kill the Earps and leads his gang to face them and Holliday at the O.K. Corral.
8	"The Last Vendetta"	July 30, 2016	0.887
At the O.K. Corral, the Earp Brothers and Doc Holliday face off against Ike Clanton's gang. Within 30 seconds, 30 rounds kill three of Clanton's men and wound Holliday, Morgan and Virgil Earp. Wyatt is unscathed, and Clanton, wounded, escapes. Months later, Clanton's men murder Morgan and cripple Virgil in retaliation. Wyatt takes matters into his own hands, as he and Doc Holliday hunt down Morgan's killers individually. This draws attention from the law, and Wyatt flees Arizona, reappearing decades later as a Western film consultant. Meanwhile, a disheartened Sitting Bull returns to Standing Rock, where he sees the Lakota doing a Ghost Dance to try and restore the land to Sioux control. Forty armed government men are sent to arrest Sitting Bull but ultimately kill him. His followers flee to Wounded Knee Creek, where 200 men, women and children are later massacred. In Missouri, the Ford Brothers help Jesse reclaim his outlaw status, but a fearful Robert, who also seeks to collect a $10,000 bounty, shoots and kills him. Jesse's death further increases his legendary status.

== Broadcast ==
Internationally, the series premiered in Australia on History on October 11, 2016.
