= Lynn Isenberg =

American novelist

- Born: Bloomfield Hills, Michigan, U.S.
- Education: University of Michigan (BA); University of Santa Monica
- Occupations: Novelist; screenwriter; producer
- Website: www.lynnisenberg.com

Lynn Isenberg is an American author, producer, and screenwriter, best known for her trilogy of comedy novels: “The Funeral Planner,” “The Funeral Planner Goes to Washington”, and “The Funeral Planner Goes Global.” Isenberg's novels inspired a digital series featuring singer-celebrity Joss Stone and actress Cynthia Gibb. Currently, Isenberg is writing and executive producing an upcoming scripted TV series "The Funeral Planner", which is directed by award-winning comedy director Donald Petrie (How to Lose a Guy in 10 Days, Miss Congeniality).

== Education ==
Isenberg attended the University of Michigan, where she graduated with a Bachelor of Arts degree in English Language & Literature, a minor in Film Studies, and an MBA/Entrepreneurial Studies audit. She holds a master's degree in Spiritual Psychology from the University of Santa Monica, where she graduated in 2010.

== Entertainment career ==
Ambitions to write and produce Hollywood mainstream movies propelled Isenberg to Los Angeles where she added producer credits on "I Love You to Death" (Kevin Kline, Keanu Reeves) and "Youngblood" (Rob Lowe, Cynthia Gibb). Isenberg co-created and executive produced the network series "I::Design" and also co-produced the first Internet Film & Music Festival (IFMF), which later transitioned into the online Sundance Film Festival. In addition to her mainstream film, TV, internet, and publishing credits, Isenberg, known as Zoom, founded the renowned Hollywood Literary Retreat & Seminars and produced a collection of interviews with master filmmakers, directors, actors, and casting directors who have gone on to become stars.

== Writing career ==
Isenberg's first entrepreneurial comedy novel, "My Life Uncovered", attracted a network bidding war. To market her second comedy novel, "The Funeral Planner", Isenberg founded the real life novel-inspired businesses "Lights Out Enterprises" and "The Tribute Network", introduced branded coffee sleeves, and also produced a tribute comedy video "Jack the Mench", which received front page publicity in the New York Times, attracting publicity in the form of guest appearances on NBC’s Today Show, CBS’s Early Show, MSN, and features in Bloomberg BusinessWeek.

Isenberg resides in Marina del Rey, CA and is a guest adjunct professor of multimedia, entertainment, marketing, and technology at Loyola Marymount University and Santa Monica College’s Academy of Entertainment Media & Technology. Lynn speaks at universities, book festivals, and funeral homes nationwide, is a member of the Writers Guild New Media Writers Caucus. She is also a celebrity partner to the National Hospice Foundation.

== Bibliography ==
=== Novel Writer ===
- "The Funeral Planner Goes Global" (2011), Focus Media Publishing
- "The Funeral Planner Goes to Washington", Second Edition (2010), Focus Media Publishing
- "The Funeral Planner", Second Edition (2010), Focus Media Publishing
- "My Life Uncovered", Second Edition (2010), Focus Media Publishing
- "The Funeral Planner Goes to the White House" (2009), Mira Books
- "The Funeral Planner" (2005), Red Dress Ink
- "My Life Uncovered", (2003), Red Dress Ink

=== Non-fiction Writer ===
- "Grief Wellness: The Definitive Guide to Dealing with Loss" (2006)
- "Grief Tributes: The Definitive Guide to Life Celebrations" (2006)

=== Producer ===
- "Animals that Serve & Heal" by Jim Dratfield and Lynn Isenberg
- "Catphoria" by Jim Dratfield (2012)
- "Dogphoria" by Jim Dratfield (2011)

== Filmography ==
=== Writer ===
- "The Funeral Planner", video short (2010)
- "True Vinyl", screenplay/story (2004)
- "Maui Heat", TV movie (1996)
- "Love Street", TV series (1994)
- "Bordello", screenplay (1994)
- "Hollywood Goes Back to Story", documentary (1994)

=== Producer ===
- "The Funeral Planner", video short (2010)
- "Love Street", TV series (1994)
- "Bordello", screenplay (1994)
- "Hollywood Goes Back to Story", documentary (1994)
- "I Love You to Death", Sony Pictures (1990)
- "Youngblood", MGM (1986)

=== Director ===
- "The Funeral Planner", video short (2010)
- "Hollywood Goes Back to Story", documentary (1994)
