= Karl Wilhelm Isenberg =

German missionary and linguist (1806–1864)

- Born: 5 September 1806; Barmen, Grand Duchy of Berg
- Died: 10 October 1864 (aged 58); Kornthal, Kingdom of Württemberg
- Other names: Carl Wilhelm Isenberg; Charles William Isenberg; C. W. Isenberg; Carl W. Isenberg; Charles Isenberg
- Occupations: Missionary; linguist
- Years active: 1824–1864

Karl Wilhelm Isenberg (5 September 1806 – 10 October 1864), spelt or known by names Carl Wilhelm Isenberg, Charles William Isenberg, C. W. Isenberg, Carl W. Isenberg or Charles Isenberg, was a German Church Missionary Society missionary and linguist to East Africa and Western India.

Isenberg compiled a dictionary and comprehensive grammar of the Amharic language, including several vocabularies in the Afar and Oromo languages. He also translated the Anglican Book of Common Prayer into Marathi and Amharic and assisted revisions of Bible translations into those languages. He was related to Hermann Hesse.

== Early life ==
Karl Wilhelm Isenberg was born 5 September 1806 in Barmen; at the age of 14 he was apprenticed to a plumber, but he taught himself languages and joined the Basel Mission in 1824. After finishing his education, he worked for some time as a teacher of Biblical Greek. Having trained at the Basel Mission seminary in Switzerland and received Anglican orders, he was transferred to Church Missionary Society (CMS) in 1832. Initially he worked in Cairo with Samuel Gobat and studied Aramaic and Arabic. Later on, he was ordained by the Church of England.

== Career ==
=== East Africa ===
CMS already sent his first missionaries Samuel Gobat, a Swiss Lutheran, and Christian Kugler to Abyssinia (now Ethiopia), East Africa in 1829. As Kugler died in Tigre in 1830, his place was supplied by Isenberg as a CMS recruit. Isenberg joined Samuel Gobat, a Swiss Lutheran, in Cairo, Egypt, and studied Amharic and Arabic language.

In 1834[1835], he joined the mission station at Adowa, Ethiopia where they stayed until 1838; however, Gobat was compelled to quit the mission from ill-health at Tigre, also spelt Tigray. After the departure of Gobat, he was joined by his fiancée Henrietta Geerling, Charles Henry Blumhardt, another missionary, and Johann Ludwig Krapf, a German Lutheran and missionary to East Africa, in 1837. They taught and converted a few boys, who were in-turn expelled by the Ethiopian Orthodoxy clergy. He spent his years between 1834 and 1838 at Adowa and Tigray. Unlike Gobat with whom he initially served in Ethiopia, he kept a social and cultural distance from Ethiopians.

From 1838, he and fellow missionaries faced resistance from the native priesthood, especially due to the different beliefs and practices of the Ethiopian Orthodox Church that were described in blunt terms that the Orthodox Christian clergymen found offensive. In March 1838, unwilling to accept Gobat's advice over the location of the mission, Isenberg was expelled from the country due to his inability to reach any accommodation with Ethiopian Orthodoxy clergymen. In 1839, he along with his new fellow missionaries Johann Ludwig, Krapf, and Carl Heinrich Blumhardt removed the mission station to Shoa, Ethiopia, where he spent for four months before leaving for London; later, he was responsible for the mission's expulsion from Ethiopia in 1843 forever. In 1842, when Isenberg returned to Shoa, his mission was refused entry, forcing him to turn his attention to Tigray again. However, his expulsion in June 1843, effectively ended CMS activities in Ethiopia.

=== Western India ===
With no possibility of return to Ethiopia, he was transferred to the CMS mission in Bombay (present day Mumbai), Western India, Bombay Presidency. In Bombay, he devoted most of his missionary work to a settlement for freed African slaves, some of whom returned to Africa after being trained as evangelists.

== Illness and death ==
Having been diagnosed as terminally ill, he left India to Germany in 1864; Isenberg later died at the age of fifty-eight on 10 October 1864 in Kornthal, near Stuttgart.

== Family ==
Karl and Henrietta married in Cairo and they had six children.

== Bibliography ==
While in London, he published a number of small dictionaries in several Ethiopian languages like Afar (Danakil), Amharic, and Oromo language (Galla) in 1840, 1841, and 1842; however, Oromo language dictionary was based on German manuscript by Krapf. These dictionaries were considered as the first dictionaries of these languages.

In 1841, he published Dictionary of Amharic, and a comprehensive grammar in 1842. In addition to these, he also published several books to be used in [future] missionary schools, which his mission planned to establish in Ethiopia. The texts which Isenberg wrote in Amharic play a role in early Amharic literature. To aid the work of evangelizing the natives, he translated the Anglican Book of Common Prayer into the Marathi and the Amharic language in 1842, as well as revising Bible translations into the same languages.

In 1843, in association with his colleague Johann Ludwig Krapf, he published at London a memoir of his time in Ethiopia entitled Journals of Isenberg and Krapf, detailing their proceedings in the Kingdom of Shoa and journeys in other parts of Abyssinia in the years 1839, 1840, 1841, and 1842. This journal contains the information about the theological controversies that were raging in the Ethiopian church of those times, including the details about the people, politics, and its geography.

=== Works ===
- Grammar of the Amharic language.
- Dictionary of the Amharic language.
- A small vocabulary of the Dankali language.
- Dictionary of the Amharic Language in Two Parts, Amharic and English, and English and Amharic.
- Regni Dei In Terris Historia Amharic. Londini : Impensis Ecclesiae Anglicae societatis ad religionem Christianam in Africa et Oriente expandendam institutae, 1841
- Journals of the Rev. Messrs. Isenberg and Krapf, missionaries of the Church missionary society: detailing their proceedings in the kingdom of Shoa, and journeys in other parts of Abyssinia, in the years 1839, 1840, 1841, and 1842.
- Vocabulary of the Galla Language.
- Abyssinia and the Evangelical Missions. 1844.

== See also ==
- Society for Missions to Africa and the East
- Johann Ludwig Krapf in Ethiopia
