= Petra Isenberg =

Computer scientist

Petra Isenberg (née Neumann) is a computer scientist specializing in collaborative and interactive information visualization and in human–computer interaction. Educated in the US, Germany, Taiwan, and Canada, she has worked in the Netherlands and France, where she is a director of research for the French Institute for Research in Computer Science and Automation (Inria), affiliated with the Laboratoire Interdisciplinaire des Sciences du Numérique (LISN) at Paris-Saclay University.

== Education and career ==
After secondary school at Stephen Decatur High School (Decatur, Illinois) in the US and the Limes-Gymnasium in Welzheim, Germany, Isenberg earned a diplom (German equivalent of a master's degree) in engineering in 2004 from Otto von Guericke University Magdeburg in Germany; her studies for this degree also included a term as a research intern at National Taiwan University. She went to the University of Calgary in Canada for doctoral study in computer science; her 2009 dissertation, Co-located Collaborative Information Visualization, was supervised by Sheelagh Carpendale.

After a stint as a visiting researcher at the University of Groningen in the Netherlands, Isenberg began working for Inria in 2010. She was promoted to director of research in 2022.

== Recognition ==
Isenberg was named to the IEEE Visualization Academy in 2023.
