= Sheelagh Carpendale =

Canadian computer scientist

- Born: Montreal, Quebec, Canada
- Citizenship: Canada
- Education: Simon Fraser University (PhD)
- Awards: 2018 ACM CHI Academy; 2018 IEEE VGTC Visualization Career Award
- Scientific career
- Fields: Computer Science (Human-Computer Interaction)
- Workplaces: Simon Fraser University; University of Calgary
- Doctoral advisor: F. D. Fracchia, T. Shermer, A. Liestman
- Doctoral students: Petra Isenberg
- Website: www.cs.sfu.ca/~sheelagh/

Sheelagh Carpendale is a Canadian artist and computer scientist working in the field of information visualization and human-computer interaction.

== Profession ==
Carpendale is a professor at the School of Computing Science at Simon Fraser University, where she holds an NSERC/SMART Industrial Research Chair in Interactive Technologies. She was previously a professor at University of Calgary, where she held a Canada Research Chair in Information Visualization and an NSERC/AITF/SMART Industrial Research Chair in Interactive Technologies. She directs the Innovations in Visualization (InnoVis.) research group. At University of Calgary, she founded the interdisciplinary graduate group, Computational Media Design. Her research on information visualization, large interactive displays, and new media art draws on her dual background in Computer Science (BSc. and Ph.D. Simon Fraser University) and Visual Arts (Sheridan College, School of Design and Emily Carr, College of Art).

== College ==
Carpendale left high school with science scholarships but instead initially opted for fine arts, attending Sheridan College, School of Design and Emily Carr, Institute of Art and Design. For ten years she worked professionally in the arts. During this time she was part of establishing the Harbourfront Arts Centre at York Quay, in Toronto. Subsequently, she has reconnected with her interests in math and science and studied computer science at Simon Fraser University. Her research expertise focuses on information visualization, interaction design, and qualitative empirical work and includes such projects as: visualizing ecological dynamics, using visualization to integrate scientific results and sounds from Antarctica to create a tool to inspire musical composition, visualizing uncertainty, visualizing social activities, and multi-touch and tabletop interaction. She has found the combined visual arts and computer science background invaluable in her research.

== Recognition ==
She is the recipient of several major awards including the British Academy of Film and Television Arts Award (BAFTA) for Off-line Learning as well as academic and industrial grants from Natural Sciences and Engineering Research Council, Intel Inc., Canada Foundation for Innovation, and Forest Renewal British Columbia. In 2012 she was awarded the NSERC E.W.R. Steacie Memorial Fellowship, which is given to the six top scientists nationally across all NSERC research areas and within 12 years of their PhD. She will also be featured in Canada's Science, Technology and Innovation Council State of the Nation 2012 report. In 2013, she was awarded the Canadian Human Computer Communications Society (CHCCS) Achievement Award, which is presented periodically to a Canadian researcher who has made a substantial contribution to the fields of computer graphics, visualization, or human- computer interaction. She was elected to the CHI Academy and received the IEEE VGTC Visualization Career Award in 2018. In 2021, she was inducted as a fellow of the Royal Society of Canada, a top honour for Canadian researchers. She was elected to the 2025 class of ACM Fellows, "for contributions to expanding the diversity of data comprehension through innovative interactive visualizations", and to the 2026 class of IEEE Fellows, "for contributions to empowerment and engagement through interactive data visualization".
