= Walter Isenberg =

American businessman and investor (born 1958)

Walter L. Isenberg
- Born: 1958 (age 67–68)
- Education: B.A. Cornell University
- Occupation: Businessman
- Known for: Co-founder, CEO, and president of Sage Hospitality Resources
- Spouse: Christie Isenberg
- Children: 2

Walter L. Isenberg (born 1958) is an American businessman and investor. He co-founded Sage Hospitality Resources and serves as the company's President and Chief Executive Officer.

== Biography ==
Isenberg grew up in Kansas City, Missouri. At the age of 14 he started working as a dishwasher at a country club while in high school where he was introduced to the hospitality industry. He graduated from Cornell University with a degree in hospitality management.

After college, he took a position with the Atlanta-based Southern Host Hotel where he developed a reputation for turning around struggling hotels. After having worked in seven different cities over a period of four years, he and fellow Cornell alumni and friend, Zachary Neumeyer founded Sage Hospitality Resources in 1984. Instead of owning hotels outright, Sage Hospitality initially focused on operating, managing, and market positioning of hotels for their owners. In the 1990s, they began to acquire hotels outright expanding beyond hotel management. Since their founding, Sage Hospitality has turned around dozens of distressed properties and supervised the restoration and conversion of historically significant buildings located in large urban centers to hotel use. As of 2014, Sage has a presence in 20 states owns and operates more than 77 hotels and 14 independent restaurants.^{[1]}

Isenberg serves on the boards of The Children's Hospital Foundation, the Denver Metro Convention & Visitors Bureau, the Downtown Denver Partnership, and Colorado Concern. Since March 2014, he has been a Director of American Hotel And Lodging Association.

== Personal life ==
Isenberg is married to Christie Isenberg and they have two daughters together, Nicole and Tirunesh.

== Awards ==
- 2017 - Hospitality Design Platinum Circle Award
- 2014, 2013 - Denver Business Journal's Power Book Nominee - Travel & Tourism
- 2010 - Inducted into the Denver & Colorado Tourism Hall of Fame
- 2009 - Maverick Thinker Award from Denver's Urban Peak
- 2004 - Rickenbaugh Community Service Award
