= Clive Isenberg =

Australian businessman

Clive Isenberg is an Australian businessman and Managing Director of Australian financial technology company Octet Group.

He founded Scottish Pacific Debtor Finance, an Australian trade-finance/invoice-discounting company (7th largest private company 1997–2000), which used factoring within the Australian market. During his time there he built Scottish Pacific to have greater than 50% of the Australian invoice discounting and factoring market share, to approximately $4 billion in annual volume.

In 2000 he sold Scottish Pacific Business Finance to St. George Bank, where he then assumed the position of general manager of its business customer division.

Isenberg was a director of Bank of Scotland subsidiaries in Australia including Capital Finance Ltd, BOS International Ltd, and the holding company of Bank of Western Australia.

Isenberg was also chairman of Factors Chain International (now known as FCI), an international association of more than 400 leading banks and other cash flow financiers excess of 80 countries, actively engaged in more than 80% of the world's cross-border factoring volume.

Isenberg was the founder and past chairman of the Institute for Factors and Discounters of Australia and New Zealand, now known as the Debtor and Invoice Finance Association. The organisation was formed in 1994 to represent the major providers of the debtor finance market. DIFA promoted the importance of the debtor finance industry to small and medium-sized enterprises, trade associations, professional bodies and government

Isenberg served as a non-executive Director of The National Hire Group from 2004-2011, which has a 46% interest in Coates Hire, an Australian general equipment hire company. While there he occupied the roles of Chairman of the Audit Committee, Member of Nomination Committee and Chairman of Remuneration Committee. Clive oversaw the National Hires acquisition of both Allight Holdings Pty Ltd and Sykes Group.

Isenberg later managed the business’ acquisition of the Coates Hire Limited business, making National Hire with Allight, the largest hire company in Australia and 6th largest hire firm in the world.

Isenberg founded the Octet Group in 2008, an Australian financial technology company providing supply chain finance and working capital finance services in Australia and international markets.
