= Hotel Eastlund =

Hotel in Portland, Oregon, U.S.

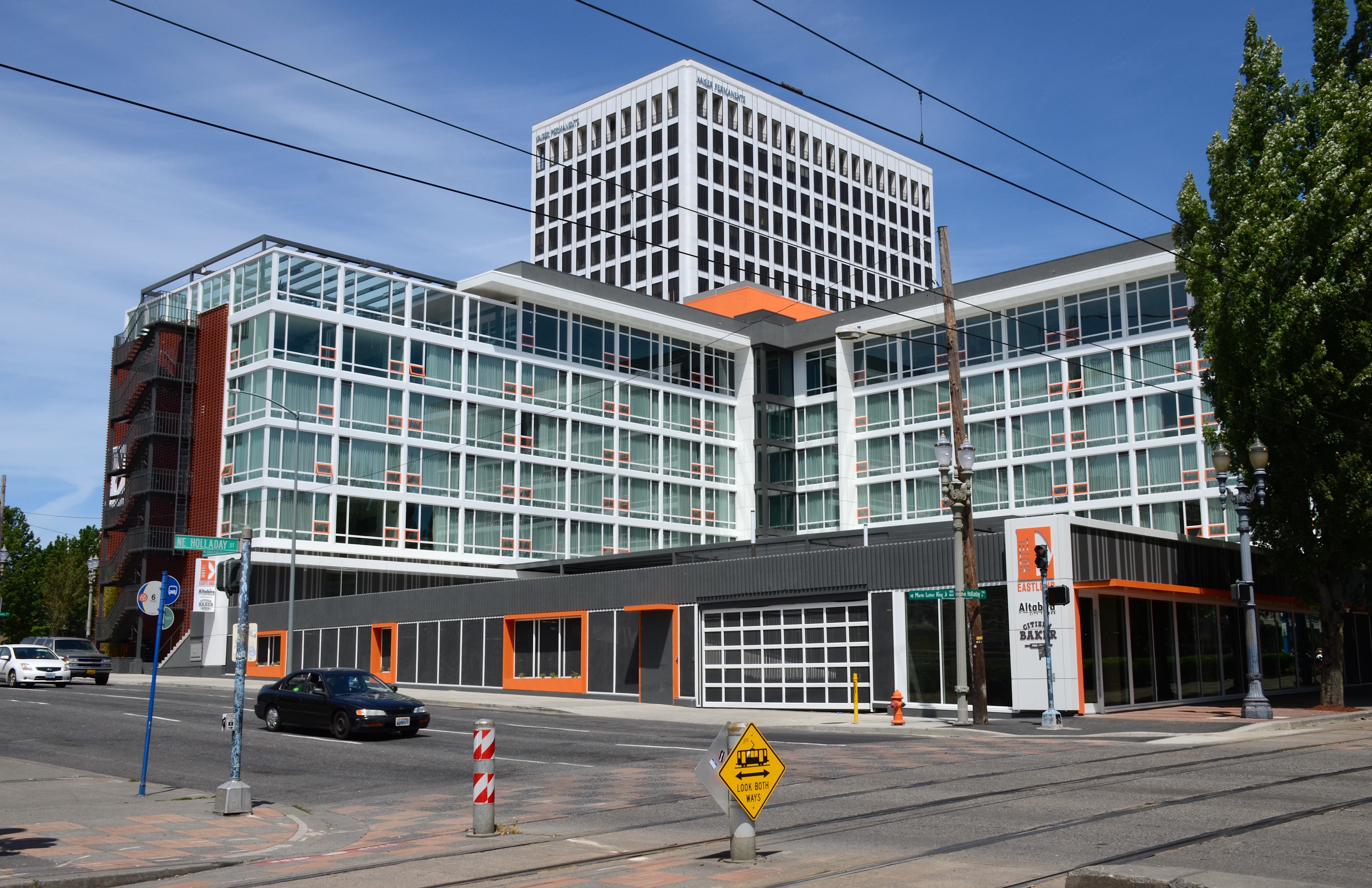
- From the southwest in 2015, when only recently renamed
- Interactive map of the Hotel Eastlund area
- Former names: Cosmopolitan Motor Hotel (1962–1989); Execulodge; Holiday Inn Downtown; Red Lion Hotel Portland – Convention Center (2003–2014)

General information
- Location: Portland, Oregon, United States
- Coordinates: 45°31′50″N 122°39′39″W
- Opened: 1962

Other information
- Public transit: TriMet MAX Light Rail and bus route 6

Hotel Eastlund is a hotel in Portland, Oregon's Lloyd District, in the United States. The building opened as the Cosmopolitan Motor Hotel in 1962. Following a remodel, Hotel Eastlund began operating in 2015. The restaurant Altabira City Tavern was located in the hotel until 2020.

The hotel is part of the Best Western Premier Collection.
