= Altabira City Tavern =

Defunct restaurant in Portland, Oregon, U.S.

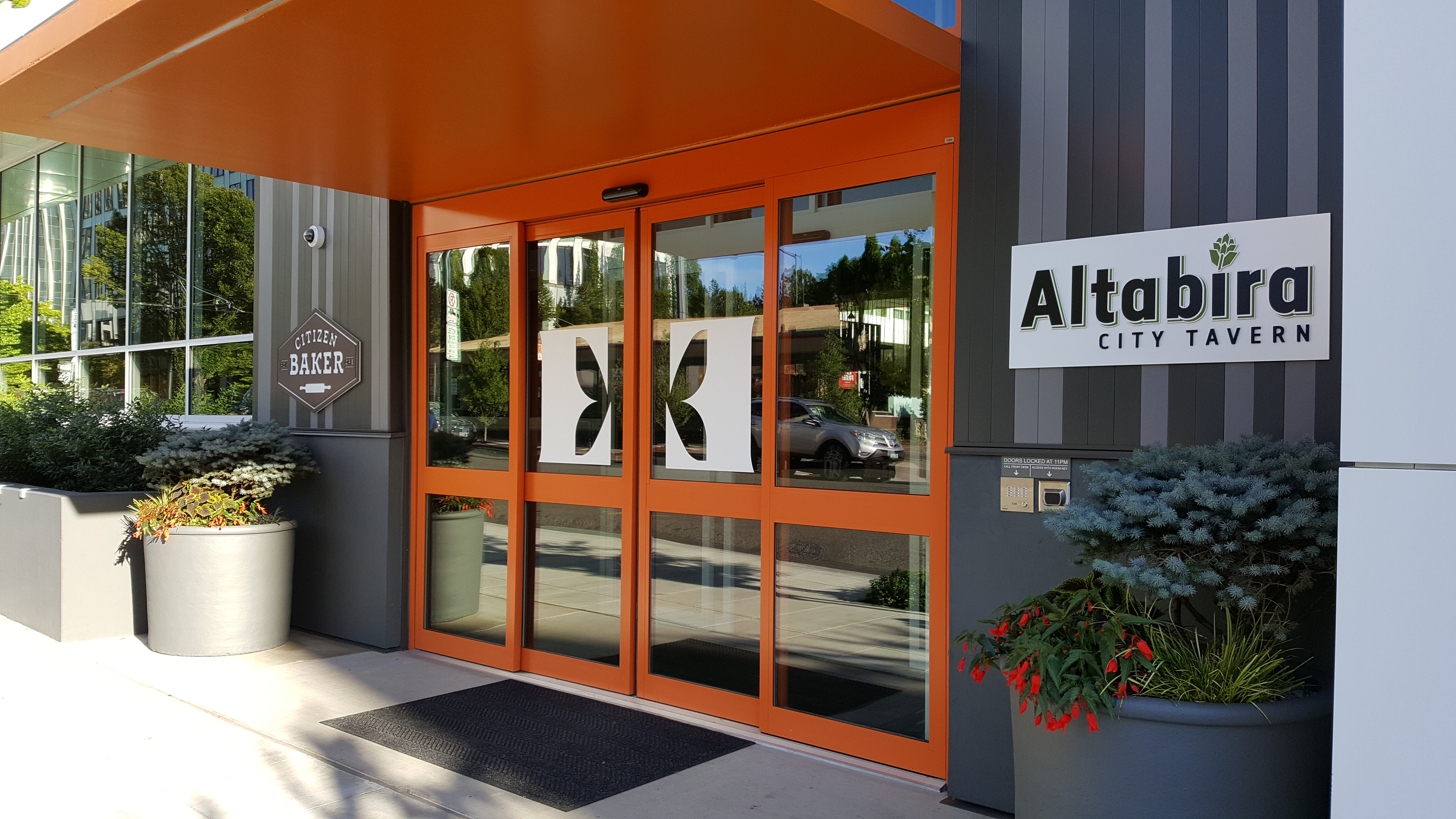
- Exterior signage for the restaurant on the street level of Hotel Eastlund, 2016
- Interactive map of Altabira City Tavern

Restaurant information
- Established: June 2015
- Closed: May 2020
- Pastry chef: Natalie Harkness
- Food type: American
- Location: 1021 Northeast Grand Avenue, Portland, Multnomah, Oregon, 97232, United States
- Coordinates: 45.5305°N 122.6609°W

Altabira City Tavern, or simply Altabira, was an American restaurant on the top of Hotel Eastlund in Portland, Oregon's Lloyd District. The restaurant opened in 2015 and closed in 2020, during the COVID-19 pandemic.

== Description ==
Altabira was housed on Hotel Eastlund's sixth floor, in the northeast Portland part of the Lloyd District. The restaurant offered "stunning views of downtown Portland, the West Hills and the twin glass towers of the Oregon Convention Center from the tavern’s Lloyd District rooftop location". The restaurant's seating capacity was approximately 103 people.

Altabira served American cuisine, and had 16 regional craft beers on tap, as of late 2015. Fodor's described the menu as "comfort fare with novel twists". The menu included spinach salad with blue cheese, herb-roasted chicken with tarragon gnocchi and fava beans, egg pappardelle with Bolognese ragu or a stuffed acorn squash, and chocolate raspberry sorbet. Other ingredients included watermelon radishes and maitake mushrooms. In 2020, for Dumpling Week, the restaurant served Maine lobster dumplings with Scotch ponzu and sesame seeds.

== History ==
The restaurant opened in June 2015, in a space previously occupied by Windows Skyroom and Lounge when the hotel was operated by Red Lion. Natalie Harkness was a pastry chef.

Chef and restaurateur David Machado closed all five of his Portland restaurants, including Altabira and Nel Centro, in 2020, during the COVID-19 pandemic. Metropolitan Tavern replaced Altabira.

== Reception ==
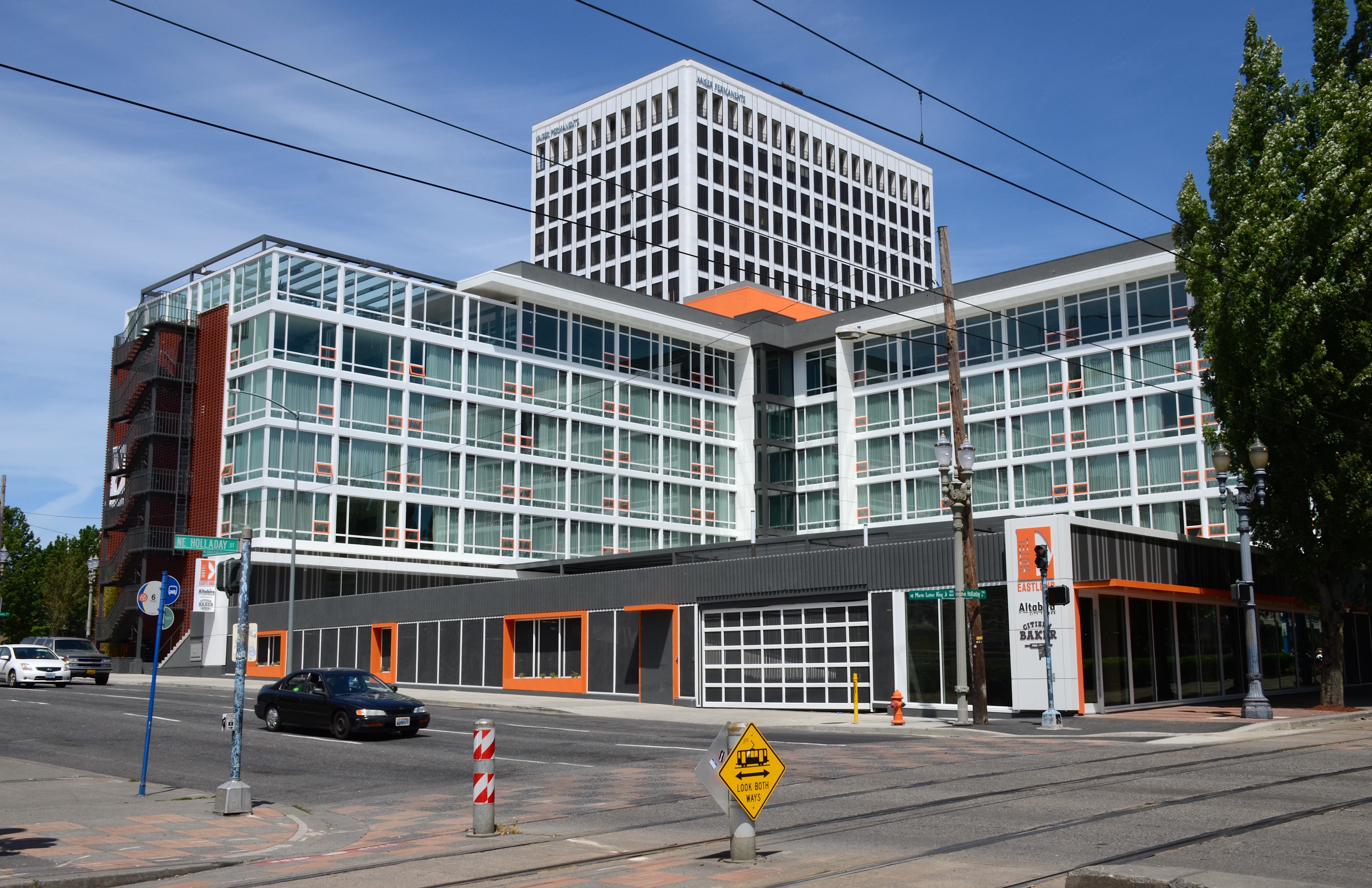
Exterior of Hotel Eastlund, 2015

Michael Russell of included the business in The Oregonian's 2015 list of the 15 "best places to eat and drink" before Portland Trail Blazers games and 2017 list of the city's 37 best restaurant and bar patios. Emmie Martin included Altabira in Business Insider's 2016 list of "the 16 coolest new businesses in Portland". Julie Lee included the restaurant in 1859 Oregon's Magazine's 2016 list of "five favorite rooftop restaurants in Portland". The magazine's Kevin Max wrote in 2018: "Imagine driving a convertible on a beautiful day. Now you have what it's like to dine at Altabira City Tavern atop Hotel Eastlund. With soaring views of the city, creative cuisine and a nightly buzz generated from hotel guests and locals, Altabira is, itself, a destination."

Eater Portland described the restaurant's patio as "a favorite hangout" for Portland Trail Blazers fans, and included the space in a list of 20 "Portland patios to catch the 2019 summer sun" as well as a 2019 list of 12 "ideal rooftop patios for views, drinks, and sun". The website's Alex Frane also recommended Altabira for viewing the city's annual Independence Day fireworks.

== See also ==
- COVID-19 pandemic in Portland, Oregon
- Impact of the COVID-19 pandemic on the restaurant industry in the United States
