= Journals of Isenberg and Krapf =

The Journals of the Rev. Messrs. Isenberg and Krapf, Missionaries of the Church Missionary Society, Detailing their proceedings in the kingdom of Shoa, and journeys in other parts of Abyssinia, in the years 1839, 1840, 1841 and 1842 is a journal published in 1843 at London. It contains the geographical memoir of the eastern part of the continent Africa, and most day by day events that took place in the original time of their happening. It is associated with the missionary works of Carl Wilhelm Isenberg and Johann Ludwig Krapf of the Church Missionary Society, and their encounter with the yet poorly known kingdom of Shewa in Ethiopia.
