= Andrew C. Isenberg =

American historian

- Born: August 6, 1964 (age 62); Chicago, Illinois
- Citizenship: United States
- Education: St. Olaf College; Northwestern University
- Occupation: University of Kansas historian
- Writing career
- Language: English
- Notable work: Wyatt Earp: A Vigilante Life

Andrew C. Isenberg (born 1964) is the Hall Distinguished Professor of American History at the University of Kansas. He is a specialist in environmental history, Native American history, and the history of the North American West and its borderlands. He was born in Chicago, Illinois, and educated at St. Olaf College, from which he graduated magna cum laude. He received his Ph.D. in History from Northwestern University. He previously taught at the University of Puget Sound, Brown University, Princeton University, and Temple University.

Isenberg has appeared in a number of documentaries, including National Geographic's America Before Columbus in 2009, American Experience in 2010, The American West in 2016, and Ken Burns' The American Buffalo in 2023.

== Publications ==
- The Destruction of the Bison: An Environmental History, 1750-1920 (New York: Cambridge University Press, 2000).
- Mining California: An Ecological History (New York: Hill and Wang, 2005).
- Wyatt Earp: A Vigilante Life (New York: Hill and Wang, 2013).
- The Republican Reversal: Conservatives and the Environment from Nixon to Trump (Cambridge, MA: Harvard University Press, 2018). Co-authored with James Morton Turner.

In addition, Isenberg has edited three academic volumes.

- The Nature of Cities: Culture, Landscape, and Urban Space (Rochester, NY: University of Rochester Press, 2006).
- The Oxford Handbook of Environmental History (New York: Oxford University Press, 2014).
- The California Gold Rush: A Brief History with Documents (Boston, MA: Bedford/St. Martin's, 2018).
