= PLS on Post =

Restaurant in San Francisco, California, U.S.

- Interactive map of PLS on Post

Restaurant information
- Established: August 30, 2022
- Owner: Sage Hospitality Group
- Chef: Thomas Weibull
- Food type: American
- Location: 545 Post St, San Francisco, CA 94102, San Francisco, San Francisco, California, United States
- Coordinates: 37.7878332°N 122.4107721°W

PLS on Post is a restaurant in San Francisco, California, United States. Sage Hospitality Group opened the restaurant in late August 2022, serving American cuisine such as hamburgers, milkshakes, and French fries.

A second location, called PLS on Sixth, opened at Hotel Zags in downtown Portland, Oregon, in May 2025.

== Description ==
The casual restaurant PLS on Post operates on the ground floor of the Hotel Zeppelin on Post Street, near Union Square. It serves "retro-inspired" American cuisine such as hamburgers and milkshakes, as well as cocktails. The abbreviation in the business name refers to "peace, love, and soul" to commemorate the counterculture of the 1960s in San Francisco. The San Francisco Standard and Sunset magazine have said the restaurant has a 1960s and "laid back" vibe, respectively. In 2024, The San Francisco Standard said of the clientele: "Less than a third of those dining at the 1960s-themed restaurant were tourists, with the remainder a mix of locals and people coming into the city for the day."

=== Menu ===
PLS has multiple varieties of "gourmet" hamburgers, including a classic smash burger with American cheese and onions, another version with blue cheese and Mission fig mayonnaise, and a "Korean-inspired" version with cheddar cheese and a gochujang barbecue glaze. Side options include chips and guacamole, French fries, and pickled vegetables. Milkshake options include chocolate, "Funfetti" with cake batter and whipped cream, strawberry, vanilla, and the Choco-Nut, which has hot fudge, peanut butter, and Reese's Pieces in glass with a chocolate rim. The drink menu includes beer, wine, and cocktails made with gin, mezcal, rum, and tequila. Among classic rock-themed cocktails are the Bad Medicine, the Black Velvet, and the Riders on the Storm. The Ginny Hendrix has gin and grape soda.

For the holiday season, the restaurant has served a Peppermint Bark Shake with chocolate and vanilla ice cream, candy cane, two varieties of peppermint bark made by Ghirardelli Chocolate Company, peppermint essence, sprinkles, whipped cream, chocolate syrup, chocolate frosting on the rim, and a cherry on top.

== History ==
PLS on Sixth, Portland, Oregon, 2026

Sage Hospitality Group opened the restaurant on August 30, 2022, in the space previously occupied by the restaurants Postrio (closed since March 2020) and The Rambler. Thomas Weibull was the opening chef.

A second location, called PLS on Sixth, opened in downtown Portland, Oregon's Hotel Zags on Clay Street on May 22, 2025. It has a seating capacity of 176 people and can accommodate 150 people in an outdoor patio. The restaurant menu is slightly modified. Among milkshakes are the Lavender Haze, which has marionberries, and The Portlandia, which has coffee ice cream and espresso beans dipped in chocolate. PLS on Sixth plans to host disc jockeys on weekends.

== Reception ==
Time Out included the Peppermint Bark Shake in a 2023 list of the nation's eleven best "over-the-top" holiday desserts.
