= Sage Hospitality Group =

American hospitality company

- Type: Private
- Industry: Hospitality
- Founded: 1984
- Founders: Walter Isenberg; Zack Neumeyer
- Headquarters: Denver, Colorado, United States
- Key people: Walter Isenberg (CEO)
- Services: Hotel management; Hotel development; Restaurant management
- Divisions: Sage Hotel Management; Sage Restaurant Concepts; Sage Investments; Sage Studio
- Website: sagehospitalitygroup.com

Sage Hospitality Group is an American hospitality development, investment and management company based in Denver, Colorado. The company operates more than 60 hotels and around 60 restaurants across the United States.

== History ==
Sage Hospitality Group was founded in 1984 in Denver, Colorado. The company's founders, Walter Isenberg and Zack Neumeyer, initially focused on hotel management, then expanded into hotel development, investment, and restaurant operations.

During the 2000s, Sage expanded its portfolio of independent and lifestyle hotels, including redevelopment projects in urban markets and mixed-use properties. Some projects included Denver Union Station and other mixed-use hospitality developments in the United States.

== Sage companies ==
Sage Hospitality Group comprises four companies:

- Sage Hotel Management, with a portfolio of nearly 60 hotels across the US.
- Sage Restaurant Concepts, founded in 2005, with more than 30 restaurant, bar and coffeeshop locations in 11 states.
- Sage Studio, which creates spaces for businesses.
- Sage Investments.

=== Sage Restaurant Concepts ===
Sage Restaurant Concepts (formerly Sage Restaurant Group), was founded in 2005 and is the restaurant management arm of the group.

==== Colorado ====
- The Corner Office Restaurant + Martini Bar, Denver (opened July 2007).
- Kachina Cantina, Denver (opened April 2017)
- Urban Farmer, Denver (opened August 2017)
- The Emporium Kitchen and Wine Market (opened November 2017).

==== Oregon ====
- Urban Farmer, Portland (opened February 2009)
- Departure Restaurant and Lounge, Portland (opened March 2009)

==== California ====
- PLS on Post, San Francisco, 2022

==== Pennsylvania ====
- Urban Farmer, Philadelphia (opened December 2015)
