= Valentine's Day in Portland, Oregon =

Annual community festival in the US

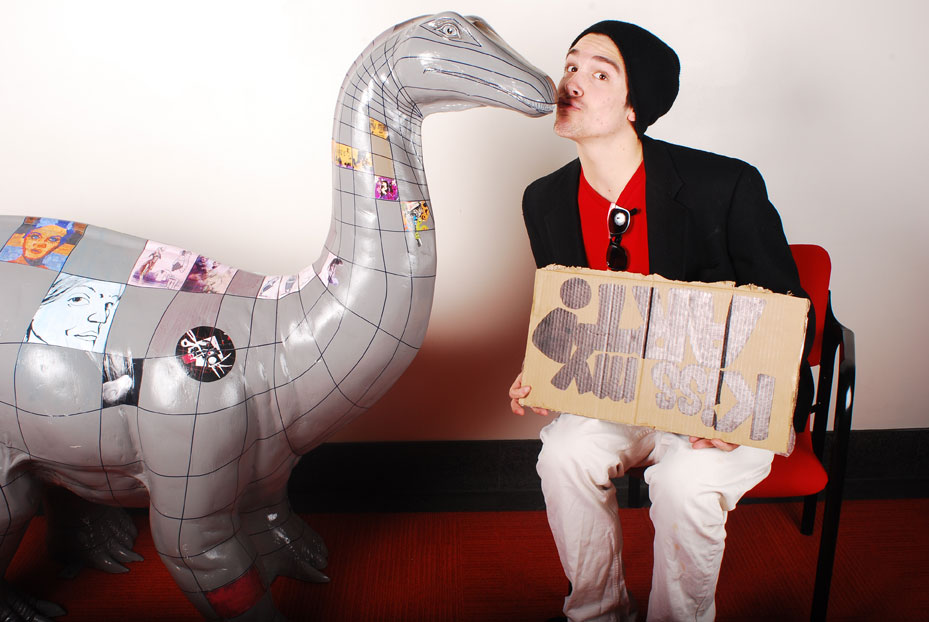
In 2009, the Art Institute of Portland hosted an open house on Valentine's Day; "Kiss My Art!" was the theme and guests could take photographs at the "Kiss My Art" kissing booth.

The holiday Valentine's Day is observed annually in the American city of Portland, Oregon. The city has seen various events and activities to celebrate the holiday, including kissing booths with animals, themed iterations of the Portland Night Market, dinner cruises on the Willamette River, and local dining specials. In 2015, Eric Chemi of CNBC wrote, "Not everybody celebrates Valentine's Day equally. Residents in some cities really go all out, but some places have barely any spirit. Portland, Oregon, for example, spends a mere 15 percent more around Valentine's Day than in a normal week during the first quarter."

== Events and activities ==
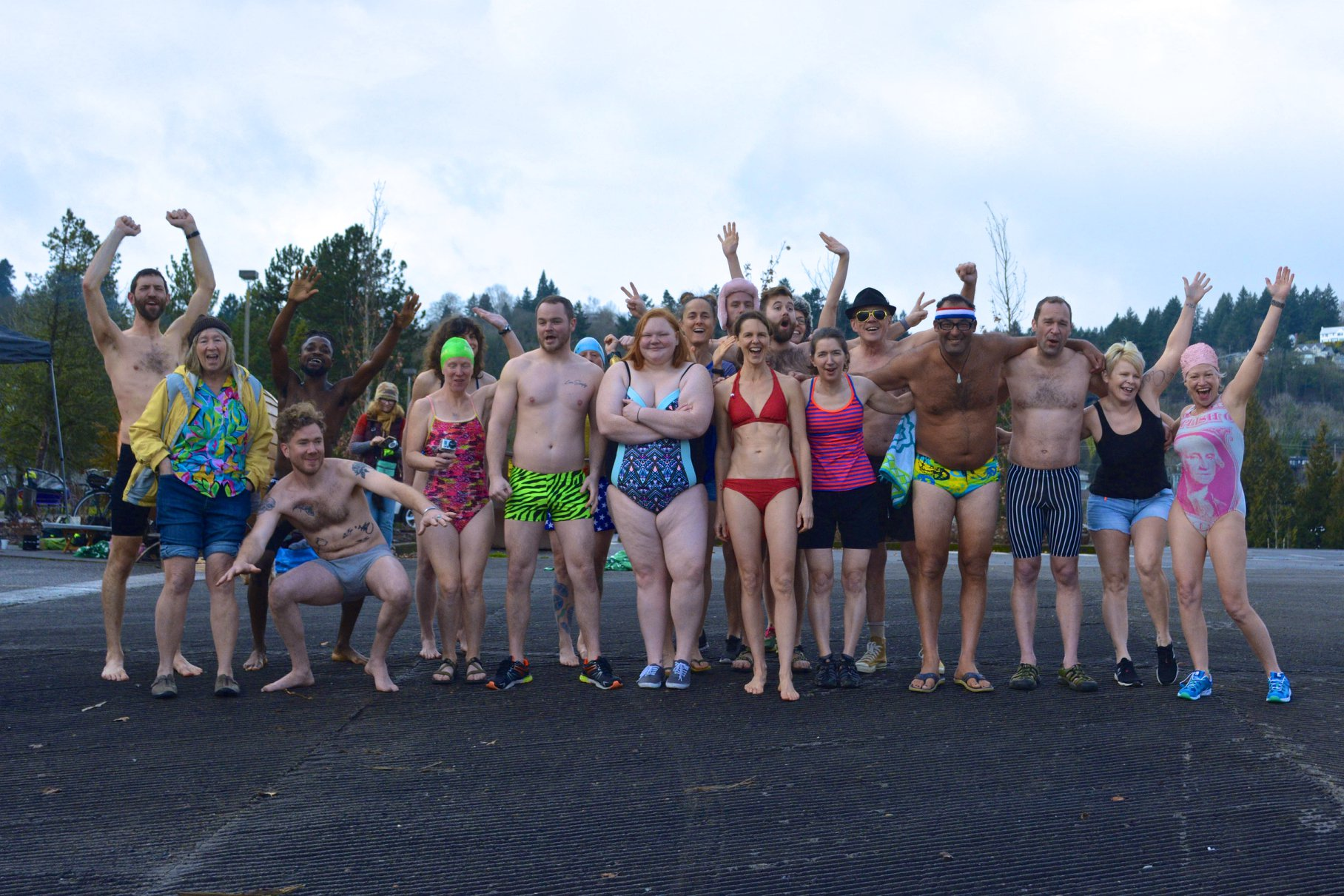
Participants in the Valentine's Dip organized by Human Access Project

The city has seen various events and activities to commemorate Valentine's Day. Human Access Project has hosted an annual Valentine's Dip in the Willamette River. The Oregon Museum of Science and Industry (OMSI) hosted "Prom-si" in 2018, as part of the museum's "OMSI After Dark" series; OkCupid was a sponsor of the event, which had a 1980s prom theme and included a laser light show. In 2020, a hotel in downtown Portland hosted a kissing booth with alpacas as part of a fundraiser, and sports announcer Bill Schonely appeared in a Portland Trail Blazers video for the holiday.

In 2023, the Oregon Zoo gave holiday-themed treats to animals as part of an enrichment program, and the operator of the Strip Club Haunted House in southeast Portland hosted "Count Dickula's Vampentine's Hotel". The Portland Night Market has hosted events themed around the holiday; the 2025 iteration was called "Lucky in Love" and activities in 2026 included dating, "heartbreak" bingo, karaoke to love songs, and "blind date with a book". In 2024, Bar Carlo and a local YMCA hosted the Indigenous Marketplace of Love, featuring art and food vendors. Forte Portland hosted the shopping event Love Fest, featuring local businesses offering chocolates, flowers, home decor, jewelry, and wine.

In 2026, Urban Forestry hosted a Valentine's Day tree planting at Cherry Blossom Park in southeast Portland. Approaching the holiday, Voodoo Doughnut planned to host ten couples via the 'Til Death Dough Us Part Wedding Giveaway. As part of a larger community effort to save the Lloyd Center and its ice rink, a group of young skaters and their parents delivered dozens of handmade Valentine's Day cards, along with signatures for a petition, to mayor Keith Wilson at Portland City Hall. The Save Lloyd campaign also hosted a "Mall Crawl" on the holiday to "show love for Lloyd Center", according to Willamette Week. The art experience Hopscotch offered a Valentine's Day package in 2026.

The Multnomah County Courthouse has seen an increase in the number of weddings around the holiday. In 2024, the courthouse hosted the first Love Day; according to The Oregonian, the event "provided free Valentine's Day wedding ceremonies for couples from diverse backgrounds with socioeconomic hardships".

=== Food and drink ===
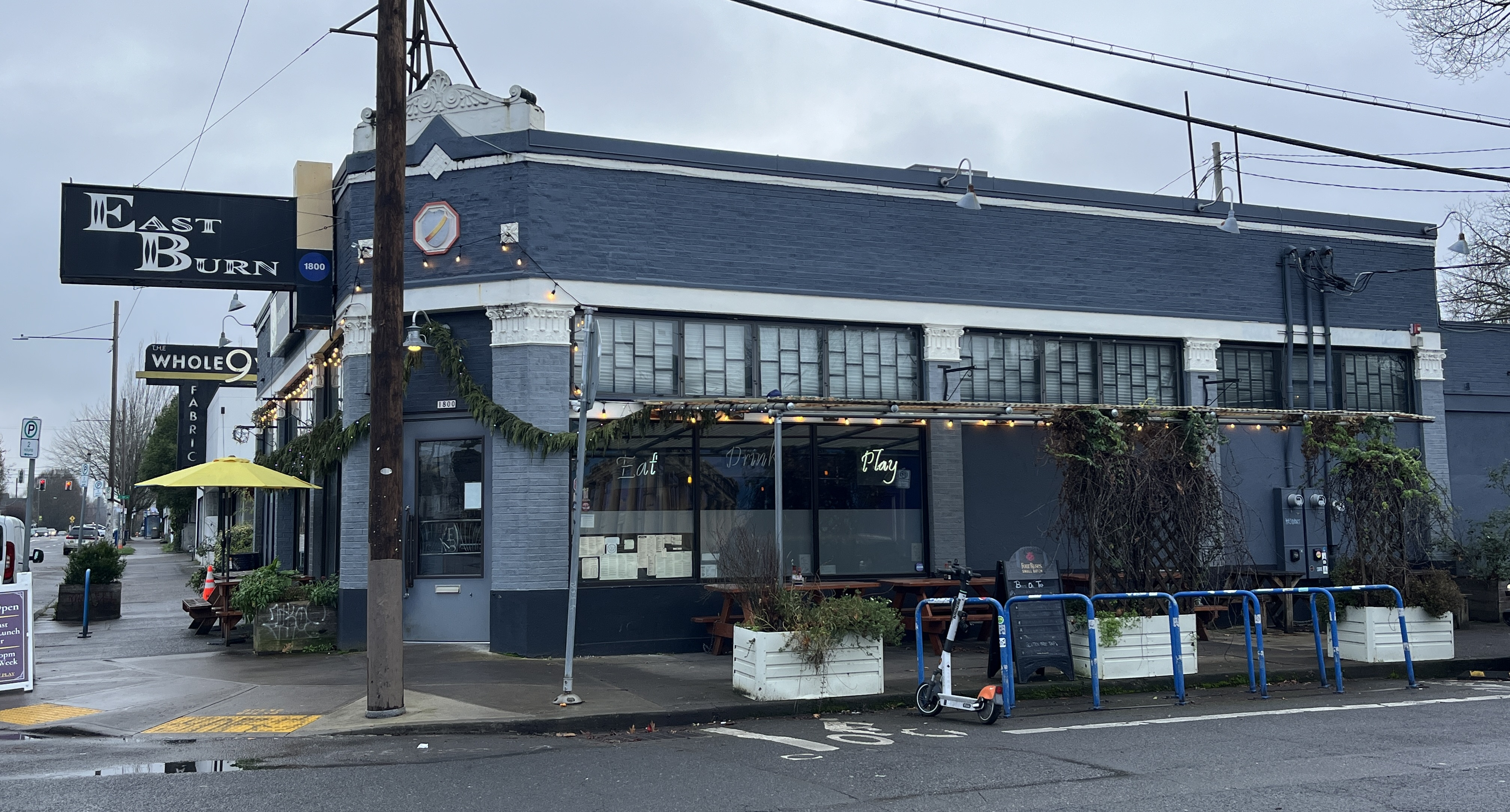
The restaurant EastBurn (exterior pictured in 2025) hosted both Valentine's Day and anti-Valentine's Day celebrations.

The Portland Spirit has offered a Valentine's Day dinner cruise on the Willamette River. The now-defunct restaurant EastBurn hosted Valentine's Day celebrations in 2015.

Some local restaurants have offered special menus for the holiday, including Abigail Hall, Arden, Carlita's, Normandie, Scotch Lodge, and Zuckercreme in 2023. Champagne Poetry Patisserie, Farina Bakery, Gabbiano's, and Lauretta Jean's offered heart-shaped food options for the holiday in 2024. Arden, Campana, Coquine, G-Love, Langbaan, Love Shack, Normandie, L'Orange, Ox, Pix Pâtisserie, Screen Door, and St. Jack hosted Valentine's Day specials in 2025. The ice cream shop Salt & Straw offered a buy one, get one free promotion for the holiday. In addition to Arden, Campana, Normandie, Ox, and St. Jack, notable restaurants hosting Valentine's Day dinners in 2026 included Andina, Brix Tavern, Canard, Flying Fish Co., Higgins, OK Omens, and Urban Farmer. In addition to the wedding promotion, Voodoo Doughnut launched a limited Valentine's Box with four doughnut varieties in 2026.

In 2025, a woman filed a lawsuit against a local Italian restaurant claiming she was refused service on Valentine's Day.

=== Alternatives and variants ===
Portland has also seen celebrations of "alternatives" and variants of Valentine's Day. In 2006, the bar Barracuda hosted an "anti-Valentine's" party; decorations included broken hearts and "life-size figures with bleeding wounds from having been struck with the arrows of love", according to The Oregonian. The Rose City Rollers have also hosted anti-Valentine's Day parties. In addition to Valentine's Day celebrations, EastBurn hosted an anti-Valentine's Day party called the "Stupid Cupid Dance" in 2015. In 2024, Lan Su Chinese Garden hosted events celebrating Qixi Festival, also known as Chinese Valentine's Day.

== See also ==
- Culture of Portland, Oregon
