= Lents Fair =

Annual event in Portland, Oregon, U.S.

- The fair's logo
- Status: Active
- Frequency: Annually
- Location: Portland, Oregon
- Country: United States

The Lents Fair (sometimes called the Lents Street Fair) is an annual event in the Lents neighborhood of Portland, Oregon, United States. A popular component of the street fair is a beauty contest for chickens. The fair also has live music and craft and food vendors.

== Background and history ==
The current iteration of the Lents Fair follows the Lents Street Fair, which started the chicken beauty contest. Previously, Lents Founders Day (or Lents Founder's Day), which was founded by Oliver P. Lent, was celebrated for decades. According to East PDX News, "After interest waned in Founders Day, neighborhood leaders and volunteers brought back a summer celebration as the Ramona Street Fair in 2010, celebrating the TriMet MAX Green Line, opened in September, 2009." The 2014 event combined Lents Founders Day and the Ramona Street Fair and was called the Lents Founder's Day Parade. It featured the Belmont Goats. The 2015 event was called the Lents Street Fair and Founder's Parade (or Lents Street Fair and Founders Day Parade). The Lents Founder's Day Parade was described as a way to commemorate "the history and cultural diversity" of the neighborhood and the Lents Street Fair was held along 91st Avenue between Foster Road and Reedway Street. The fair has been held at various locations, but is traditionally located at the southwest corner of Lents Park in the Lents neighborhood.

Amanda Gerace organized the 2015 event, which was attended by thousands of people and had approximately 50 exhibitors. The 2016 fair was held at the intersection of 92nd Avenue and Foster Road, on vacant lots previously occupied by the Lents International Farmers Market and the Belmont Goats. It had a beer garden, a "village", and 42 exhibitors. An estimated 800 people attended the fair. The rock band The Slants performed at the 2017 event, which had approximately 100 vendors. Approximately 3,000 people attended the 2018 fair. The 2019 event was held at 92nd and Harold Street, and had approximately 190 vendors; activities included face painting, a 90-foot-long obstacle course with an inflatable slide, and a robotics exhibit.

Robert Schultz has been the event's chair and event coordinator. According to Schultz, organizers considered calling the event the Lents Founder's Day Celebration and Fair.

== Chicken Beauty Contest ==
The Lents Chicken Beauty Contest is a component of the fair. It has been described as "sweet and silly".

Jonah Willbach and Maggie Kearns have been credited as the contest's creator. The inaugural event in 2015 had 15 entries and the winner was Penelope, a white Silkie. There were 16 entrants in 2016. Snazzy was the winner and Grace-Mary, an "Easter Egger" with rust and silver feathers, placed second. Honorable mention went to a zebra-striped Barred Plymouth Rock named Sapphire. In 2017, all 19 entrants received a 50-pound bag of poultry feed and the winner received a gift basket and a trophy with the engraving "2017 Most Beautifulist Chicken Beauty Contest – Lents Street Fair". A 4-month-old white crested blue Polish hen called Cordon Bleu won the 2017 contest. The fifth contest in 2019 had 19 entries. Azteca, a Tolbunt Polish, won the competition. Naked Necks have also been entered into the contest.

The contest has also been called the "Most Beautifulist Chicken Beauty Contest".

== See also ==
- Culture of Portland, Oregon
