= Rumpless Game =

British breed of chicken

- Other names: Manx Rumpy; Persian Rumpless
- Country of origin: United Kingdom

Traits
- Weight: Male: Standard: 2.3–2.7 kg Bantam: 620–740 g; Female: Standard: 1.8–2.3 kg Bantam: 510–620 g
- Egg color: tinted
- Comb type: single

Classification
- PCGB: rare hard feather
- Chicken; Gallus gallus domesticus

The Rumpless Game is a British breed of tail-less chicken. It may have originated on the Isle of Man, and may thus be known as the Manx Rumpy. There are both standard-sized and bantam Rumpless Game.

== History ==
=== Manx Rumpy ===
The British breed has never been imported to the United States. In 1958 some tail-less birds, supposedly of Iranian origin, were crossed with other breeds to produce an approximation of the British type, and the name "Manx Rumpy" applied to them, perhaps by analogy with the tail-less Manx cat. The Livestock Conservancy recommends that they be called "Persian Rumpless". They are not recognised by the American Poultry Association. They are good layers of brown eggs, and may also occasionally lay white, blue, or green eggs.

== Characteristics ==
The Rumpless Game, like all other tail-less breeds such as the Araucana and the Barbu d'Everberg, lacks the uropygium from which the tail grows. It is a hard-feathered breed, with a single comb and small wattles and earlobes. All colours are acceptable under the standard of the Poultry Club of Great Britain.

Rumpless Game males weigh 2.3–2.7 kilograms (5–6 lb) and hens 1.8–2.3 kg (4–5 lb).

== See also ==
- Rumpless chickens
