= G-Love =

G-Love may refer to:

- G. Love, American singer, rapper and musician
- G-Love (restaurant), New American restaurant in Portland, Oregon
- enemy from SpongeBob SquarePants: Battle for Bikini Bottom
