= Hopscotch (art experience) =

Immersive art experience

Hopscotch's logo

Hopscotch is an immersive art experience. There are locations in San Antonio and Portland, Oregon. Hopscotch was founded by Hunter Inman and Nicole Jensen. It began as a nine-week pop-up in conjunction with South by Southwest in Austin, Texas in 2019.

== History and locations ==
=== Austin, Texas (pop-up) ===
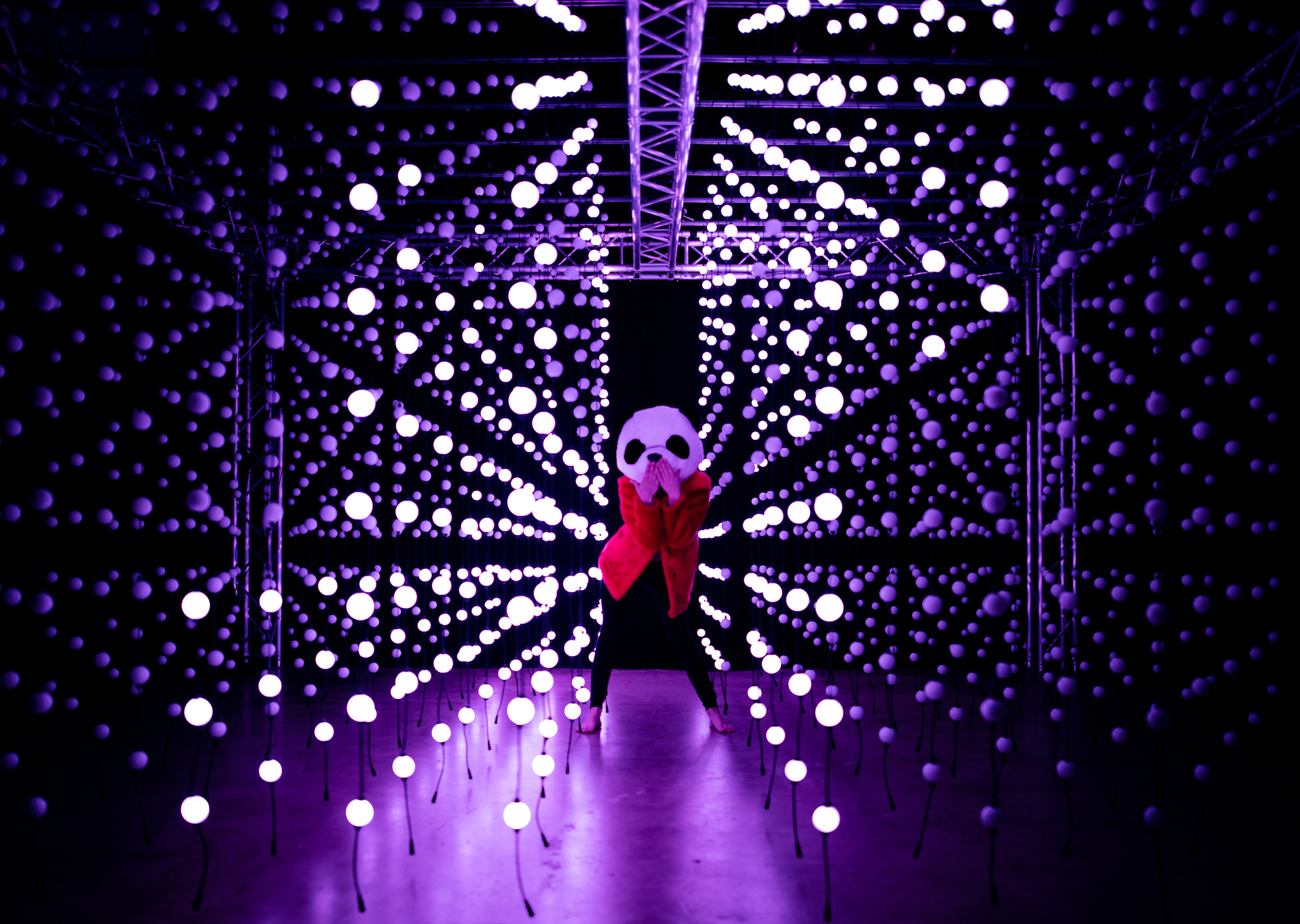
Matrix at Hopscotch: Light and Sound

Hopscotch: Light and Sound opened on February 14, 2019, with thirteen distinctive installations by various artists and encouraged guests to participate and explore their surroundings in a playful manner. Proceeds from the pop-up were donated to local art-focused non-profit organizations.

=== San Antonio ===
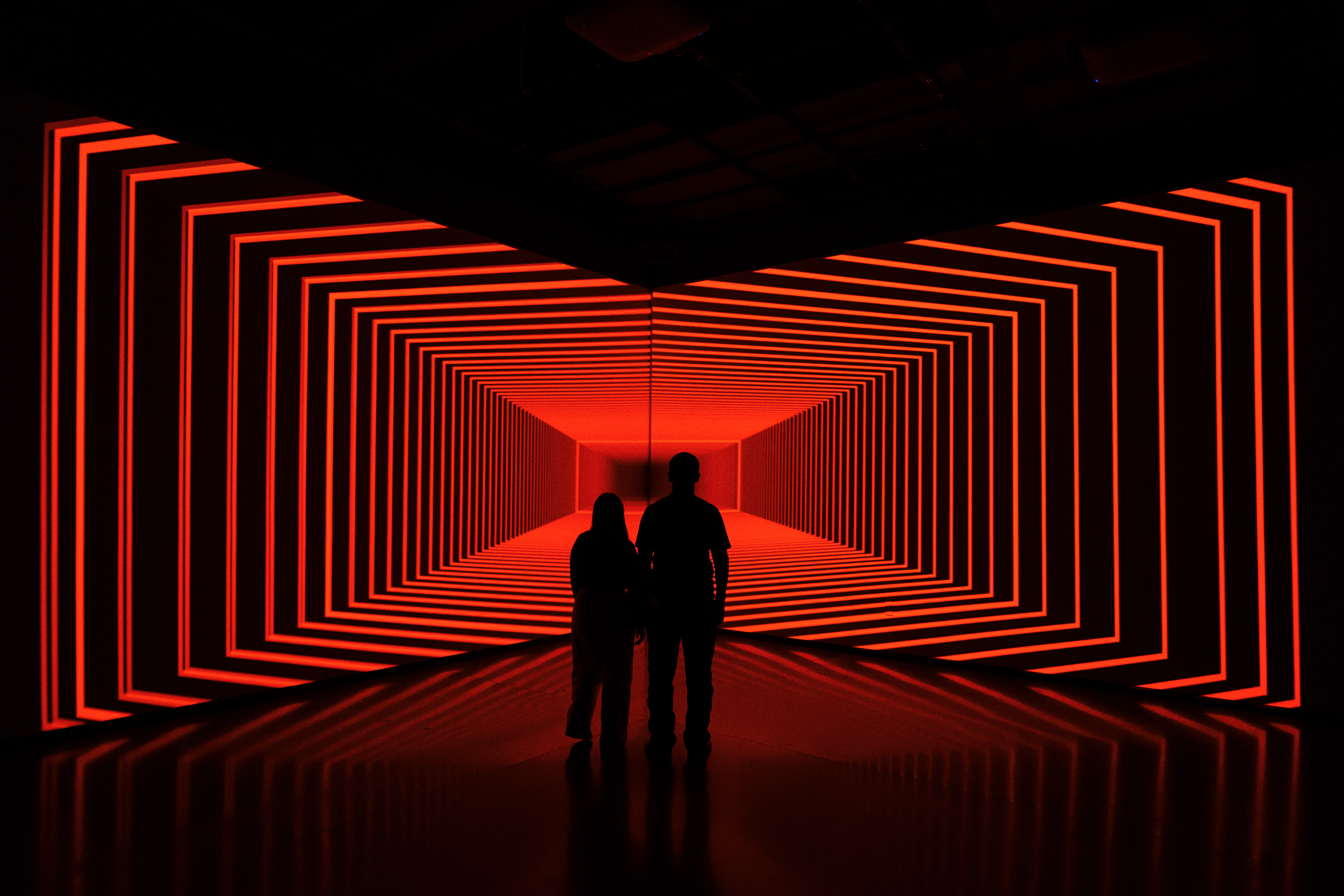
Onion Skin at Hopscotch San Antonio

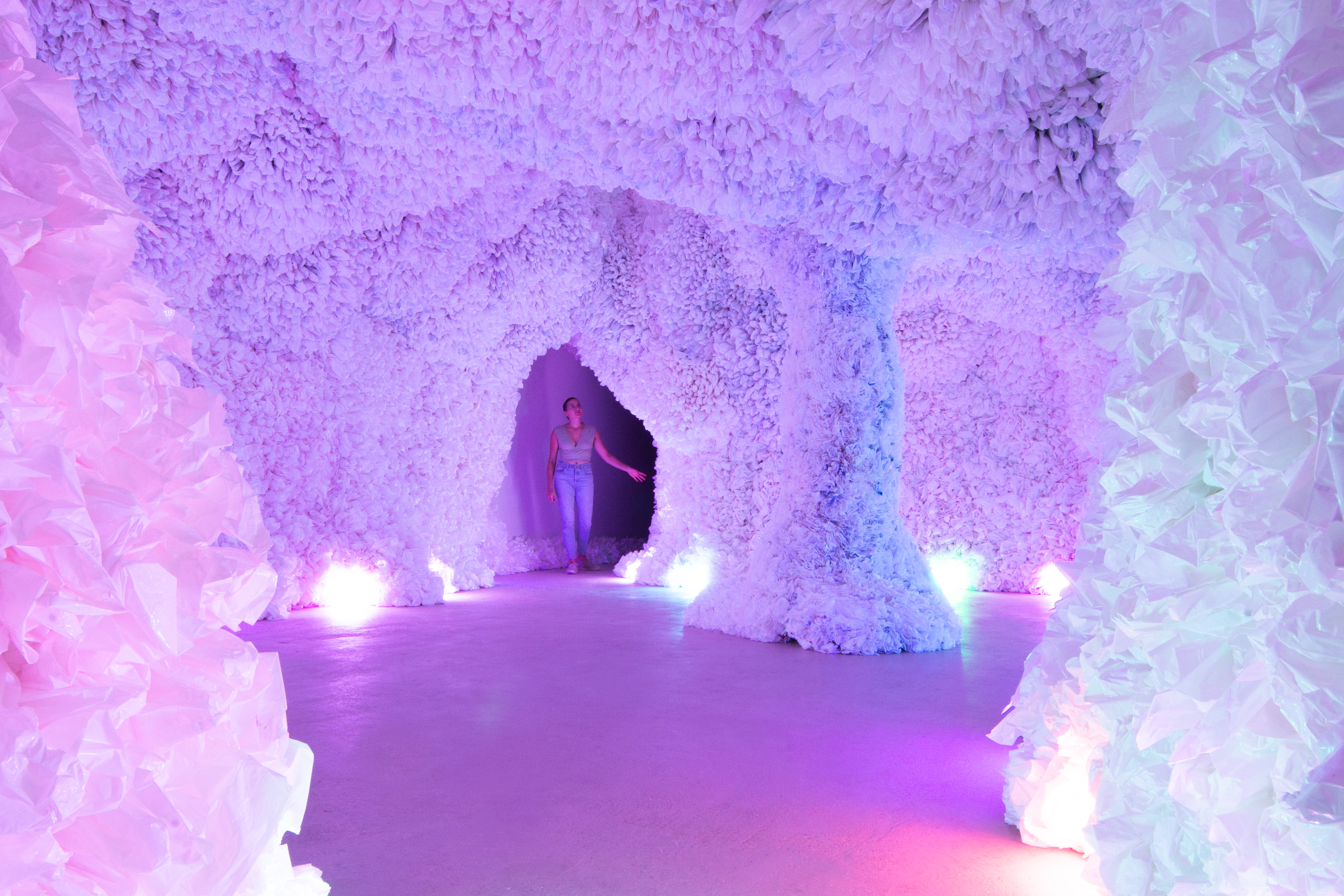
Rainbow Cave at Hopscotch San Antonio

Hopscotch San Antonio opened in October 2020 and occupies a 20,000 square-foot space in the Travis Park Plaza, previously an old bank building. As of 2025, there are fifteen installations, including:

- Down the Rabbit Hole, described as a "mural and chandelier installation inspired by Alice in Wonderland with hidden meanings and easter eggs."
- GAZE, described as a "rainbow LED installation that shares messages of love and acceptance for all."
- Onion Skin, described as a "14-minute video projection experience that explores the re-composition of time and space."
- Rainbow Cave, described as a "beautiful art installation created by salvaged plastic bags and fishing line that explores the human relationship with plastic."

The bar offers cocktails, non-alcoholic beverages and small snacks, occasionally partnering with local food trucks on the patio. In 2022, iHeart Radio named Hopscotch's bar one of the best in San Antonio. Hopscotch was named Best Creative Date Night, Best Art Gallery, and Best Unconventional Art Experience by San Antonio Magazine. It was also named as a finalist for Leading Cultural Destination's Best Immersive Museum Experience and USA Today's Readers' Choice Best New Attraction.

=== Portland, Oregon ===
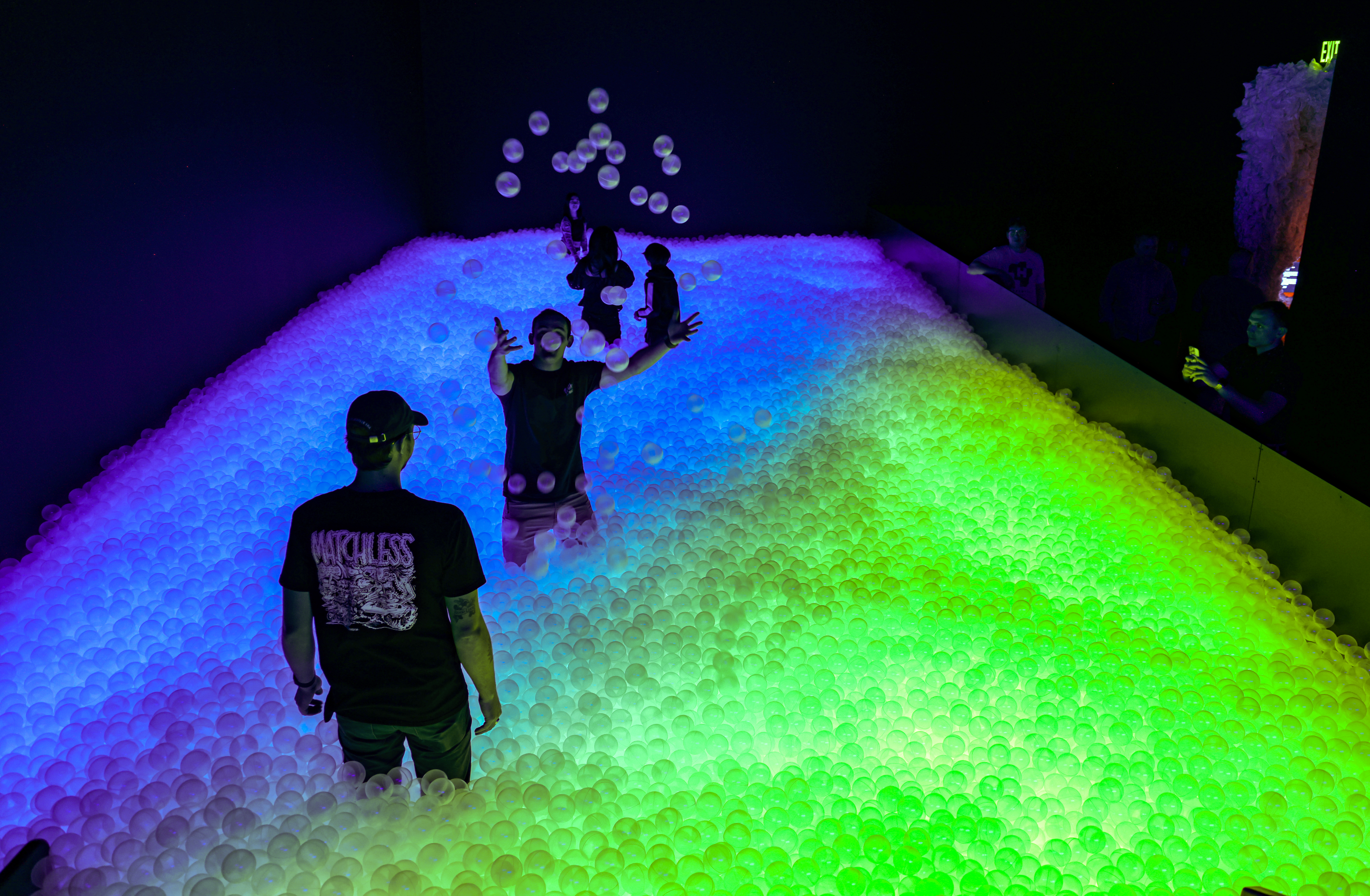
Diodic Daydream at Hopscotch Portland

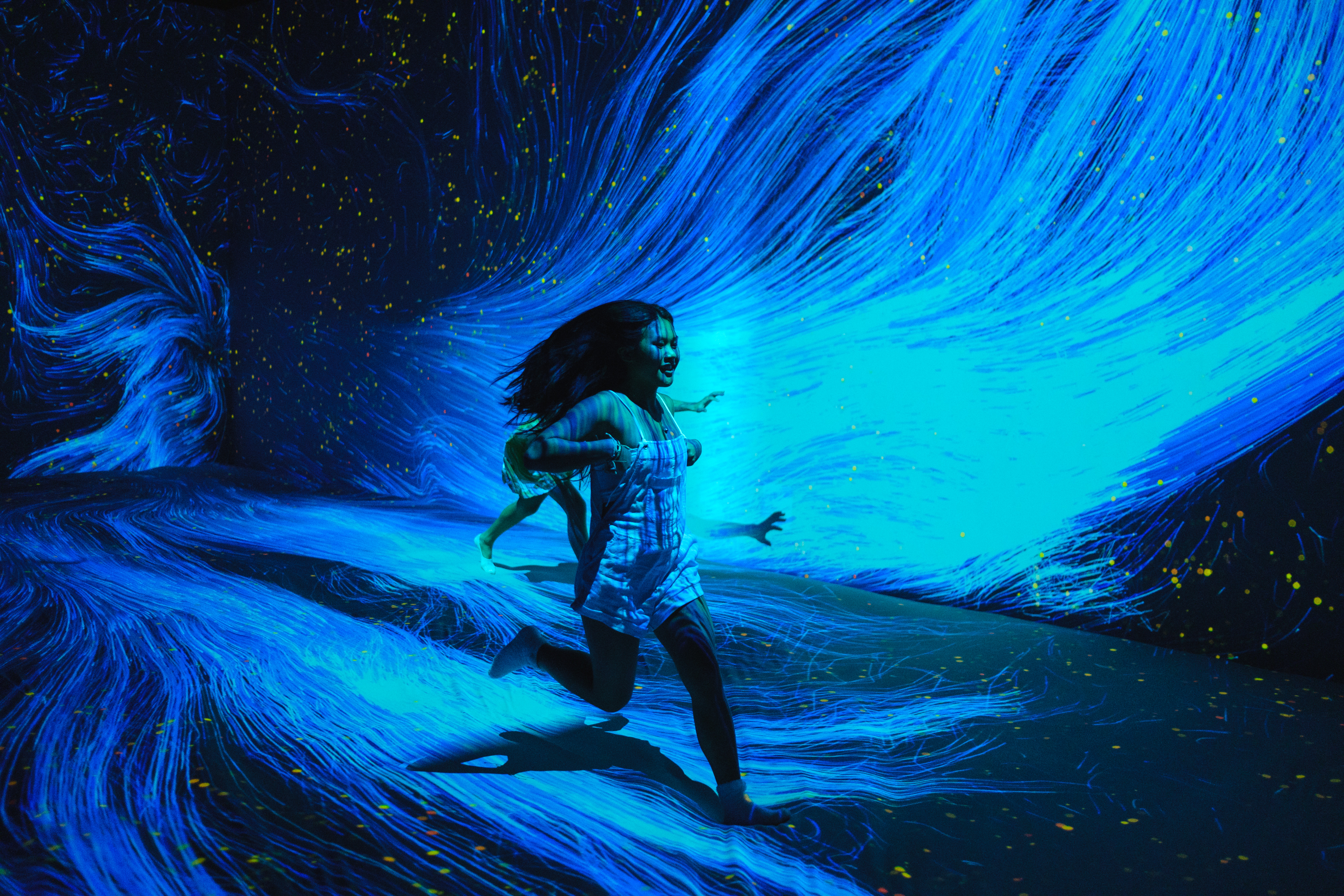
Quantum Trampoline at Hopscotch Portland

The Portland location, sometimes called Hopscotch Portland, opened in June 2023. It has been described as an "immersive art experience", an "immersive gallery space", and an "unconventional art venue". Hopscotch operates in a 23,000-square-foot space in the Goat Blocks.

There are fourteen installations, including:

- Augmented Normalcy, described as "a VR exhibit that allows visitors to view themselves from unrealistic angles while wandering through a cartoony, artificial turf-covered landscape"
- Diodic Daydream by Matchless Builds, described as "a glowing ball pit that manages to be both playful and oddly soothing"
- Quantum Trampoline by Kuflex, described as "a bounce-activated laser light extravaganza" and "a responsive light display that transforms based on the movements of guests bouncing along a trampoline"
- Unknown Atmospheres, described as "a contemporary hall of mirrors where audiences watch curtains of pingpong ball-sized spots of light chase each other, flashing and pulsing in precise synchrony to an electronic symphony"

The bar has cocktails and non-alcoholic drinks, as well as a festival-inspired nostalgic food menu. Food options include ice cream, macaroni and cheese, popcorn, and waffles. The Capri Sun is a passion fruit margarita with chamoy and the Celestial Unicorn has butterfly pea lemonade, lavender, and edible glitter on the rim. Hopscotch served Kate's Ice Cream in 2024.

In 2026, Hopscotch was among local restaurants, community organizations, and other businesses that joined the "We Are Rip City" campaign in support of the Moda Center renovation project.

== See also ==
- Culture of Portland, Oregon
- Fathom (art installation), a temporary project in Portland
- List of artists and art institutions in Portland, Oregon
