= Araucana =

Chilean breed of chicken

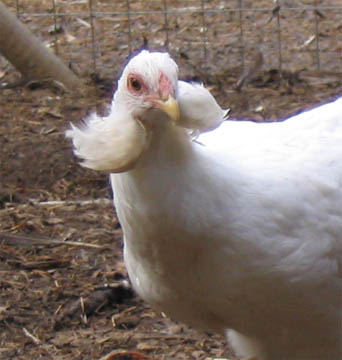
- A white hen with ear-tufts
- Conservation status: FAO (2007): not at risk
- Other names: Spanish: Gallina Mapuche; Mapuche Fowl; South American Rumpless
- Country of origin: Chile
- Distribution: Worldwide

Traits
- Weight: Male: Large: 2.7–3.2 kg Bantam: 740–850 g; Female: Large: 2.2–2.7 kg Bantam: 680–790 g
- Skin colour: white
- Egg colour: blue or green
- Comb type: pea

Classification
- APA: all other standard breeds
- ABA: all other comb clean leg
- PCGB: soft feather: light
- APS: light breed softfeather
- Chicken; Gallus gallus domesticus

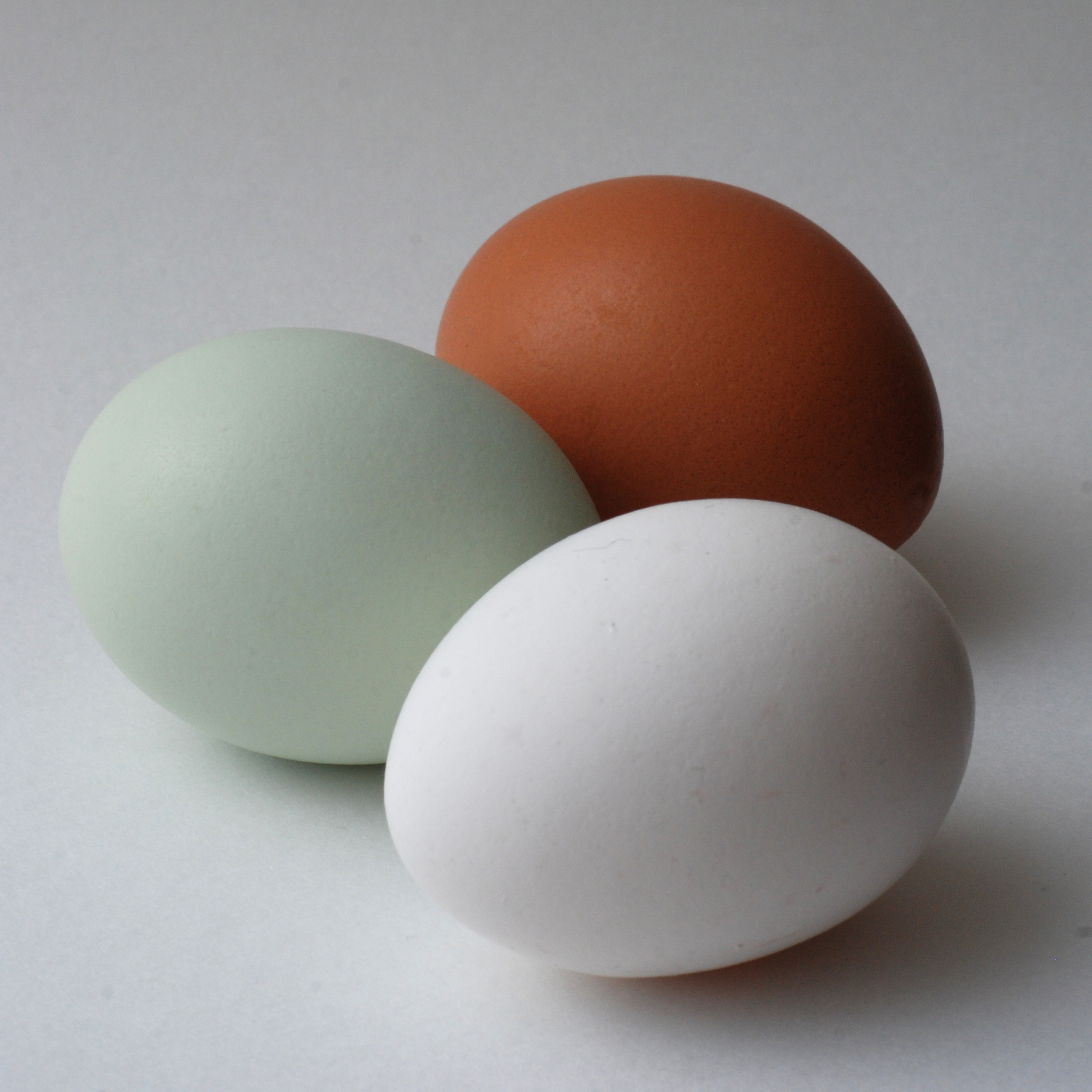
An Araucana egg (left) with white and brown eggs for comparison

The Araucana (Spanish: Gallina Mapuche) is a breed of domestic chicken from Chile. The name derives from the historic Araucanía region where it is believed to have originated. It lays blue-shelled eggs, one of very few breeds that do so.

Breed standards for the Araucana vary from country to country. It may have unusual tufts of feathers on the ears, and may be rumpless, without a tail and tail-bone; in the United States it may for this reason be known as the South American Rumpless. Both ear-tufts and rumplessness are caused by lethal genes, so not all birds display these traits. The Ameraucana breed and "Easter egger" hybrids of the United States, which also lay blue or green eggs, both derive from the Araucana.

== History ==
The early history of the Araucana is not documented. The birds were commonly seen in South America in the early twentieth century. The Spanish aviculturist Salvador Castelló, who visited Chile in 1914, saw them and named them "Gallina Araucana", as many were found among the Mapuche people of the Araucanía region of Chile, whom the Spanish called Araucanos. Castelló believed the birds to belong to a new species, and reported his observations at the First World's Poultry Congress in The Hague in 1921. The systematic name Gallus inauris was proposed for them, and adopted at the Second World's Poultry Congress in Barcelona in 1924. It was later established that the Araucana belongs to the same species as other domestic chickens, Gallus gallus domesticus.

The blue egg of the Araucana was at this time thought to be unique among chickens. In 1933 Reginald Punnett showed that the blue egg ("oocyan") gene in chickens is dominant with respect to white, while in combination with genes for brown eggs, various shades of green and olive are produced. In modern times, the Ameraucana breed, a derivative of the Araucana, also lays blue eggs, while hybrid birds carrying the dominant oocyan gene may in the United States be called "Easter eggers".

Several theories have been advanced to explain the origin of the blue egg characteristic. It has been variously attributed to hybridisation with Tinamus solitarius, a species of tinamou (dismissed as "erroneous" by Helmut Sick); to genetic mutation; and to the action of a retrovirus soon after the domestication of the chicken.

Blue Araucana eggs were taken to Australia from New Zealand in the 1930s. The breed was standardised in the 1980s.

Blue-egg chickens from South America were introduced to the British Isles at various times in the early twentieth century. The modern British-type Araucana derives from birds from a Chilean ship that was wrecked in the Hebrides. The British Araucana was developed mainly by George Malcolm in Scotland in the 1930s.. He introduced the lavender plumage variety, and bred the bantam Araucana in the 1940s. The British-type Araucana was standardised in 1969 or 1974.

In the United States, two breeds were established: the Araucana, which has ear-tufts and is rumpless, was standardised in 1976; and the Ameraucana, which is bearded, muffed and tailed (and thus similar to the tailed British type), and was added to the Standard of Perfection in 1984.

There has been a long and inconclusive debate about the origin of the Araucana and whether it derives from chickens brought by Europeans after Columbus reached the Americas in 1492, or if it was already present. A report published in 2007 on chicken bones found on the Arauco Peninsula in south-central Chile suggested pre-Columbian, possibly Polynesian, origin. A report published in 2008 found no evidence of pre-Columbian introduction from Polynesia.

The world-wide conservation status of the Araucana is "not at risk"; population data for Chile is not reported.

== Characteristics ==
There are both full-sized and bantam Araucanas. They may be either normally tailed or rumpless. The Araucana has a pea comb and lays approximately 250 blue or green eggs per year.

In Australia, only the tailed Araucana is recognised in the Australian Poultry Standards; both tailed and rumpless may be exhibited.

The British standard accepts both tailed and rumpless; they may be treated as separate breeds. The British type of Araucana has a beard and muffs which conceal the earlobes.

In North America, Araucanas have long ear-tufts and are rumpless. As both ear-tufts and rumplessness are caused by autosomal dominant lethal alleles, not all of the birds can display these traits.

A total of twenty plumage varieties are listed for the Araucana by the Entente Européenne d’Aviculture et de Cuniculture. Of these, five are recognised by the American Poultry Association for large fowl: black, black breasted red, silver duckwing, golden duckwing, and white; for bantams, buff is added to these. The Australian Poultry Standard recognises black, cuckoo, lavender, splash, white and any colour which is standard in Old English Game. The Poultry Club of Great Britain recognises twelve colours: black, black-red, blue, blue-red, crele, cuckoo, golden duckwing, lavender, pile, silver duckwing, spangled, and white.
