= Portland Winter Light Festival =

Annual festival in Portland, Oregon, U.S.

- Logo

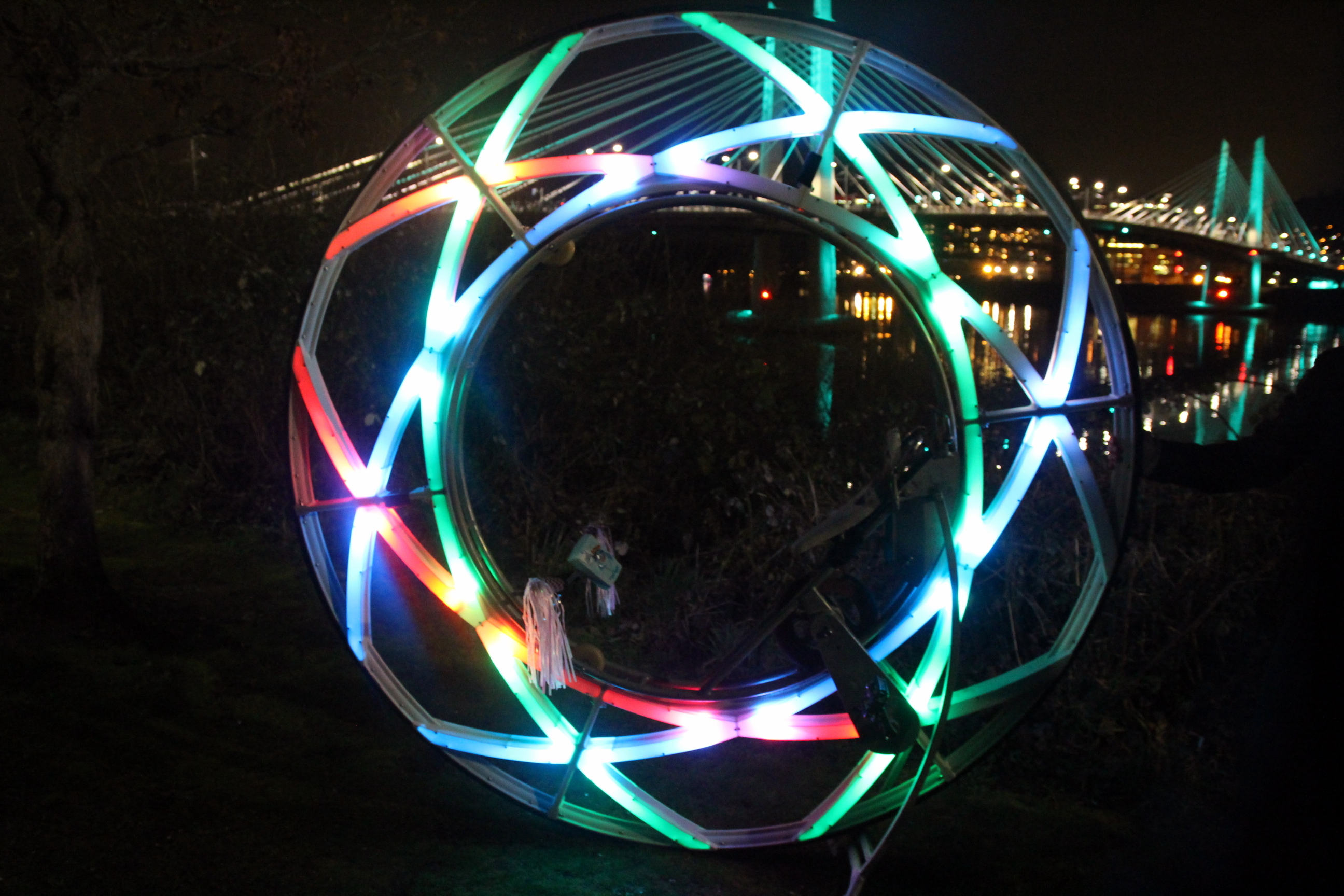
- A display at the 2016 festival
- Location: Portland, Oregon
- Country: United States
- Attendance: 262,000 (2026)
- Website: pdxwlf.com

The Portland Winter Light Festival is an annual winter light festival in Portland, Oregon. Each year has been presented by the local nonprofit Willamette Light Brigade. The festival is open to the public and free to attend. Approximately 262,000 attended in 2026.

== History ==
The 2017 festival was held primarily along the waterfront by the Oregon Museum of Science and Industry, The Oregon Rail Heritage Museum and the Portland Spirit and across the Willamette River at Zidell Yards, and had smaller installations throughout the city. This year had the official theme of "Between the River and the Stars". Over 48,000 people attended in its second year and over 70 artists, performers, and creators participated. Zidell Yards was the site of the Fire Art Garden, and the Art Lantern Parade made its way along Southeast Water Avenue and the Eastbank Esplanade. Educational speakers held panels every night as part of the Light Science Talks showcase. Entertainment along the 1.5-mile route included the Flash Bang Band and Misty Krewe of Nimbus.

During the COVID-19 pandemic, festival organizers pivoted to a 'socially distanced' version of the event with the "Portland Winter Light (non)Festival". The event was held over two weekends to prevent crowds from gathering at any specific artworks, and art installations were located in each quadrant of the city. The (non)Festival ran from February 5-6 and February 12-13, 2021. According to Executive Director Alisha Sullivan, “When we approached local businesses, organizations and artists about moving ahead with this year’s experience, we weren’t sure what the response would be – but we were amazed by the positive reaction. It’s clear that everyone is craving a sense of placemaking and civic engagement.”

== Reception ==
Stephanie Yao Long of The Oregonian called the event "playful and wondrous". Martin Cizmar of the Willamette Week wrote, "This new event makes good use of the new Tilikum Crossing Bridge, not to mention the long, dark winter nights our latitude ensures." In May 2017, the festival was featured on OPB's Oregon Art Beat television show, which stated "An easy walk along the Eastside Esplanade allows a visitor to take in everything from elaborate interactive LED sculptures to large-scale projection mapping to post-apocalyptic, fire-powered spaceships." A feature in Amex Essentials highlighted the Portland Winter Light Festival. The event was the sole American festival to be included.

== See also ==
- Culture of Portland, Oregon
- Fathom (art installation), launched at the 2024 festival
- Winter Wonderland (Portland, Oregon), annual holiday attraction
