= Love Shack (bar) =

Bar in Portland, Oregon, U.S.

- Interactive map of Love Shack

Restaurant information
- Location: 1645 Northwest 21st Avenue, Portland, Multnomah, Oregon, 97209, United States
- Coordinates: 45.5345°N 122.6950°W
- Website: theloveshackpdx.com

The Love Shack is a bar and restaurant in Portland, Oregon, United States. It is a companion establishment to G-Love.

== Description ==
The tropical-themed bar and restaurant Love Shack operates on 21st Avenue in the Slabtown district of Northwest Portland's Northwest District. The Oregonian has described the bar as "beachy". In addition to drinks, the business serves small plates. The menu includes ahi tuna wonton tacos. Drinks include Manhattans, martinis, and Negronis.

The brunch menu includes Dungeness eggs Benedict and Nashville fried chicken and waffles.

== History ==
Owner Garrett Benedict of G-Love opened the bar in February 2024. Quintin Scalfaro is the beverage director.

The Love Shack began serving brunch in February 2025.

== Reception ==
Love Shack won in the Best New Bar category of Eater Portland's annual Eater Awards in 2024. The Oregonian included the restaurant in an overview of Portland's best new brunches of 2025.
