= EastBurn (restaurant) =

Defunct restaurant in Portland, Oregon, U.S.

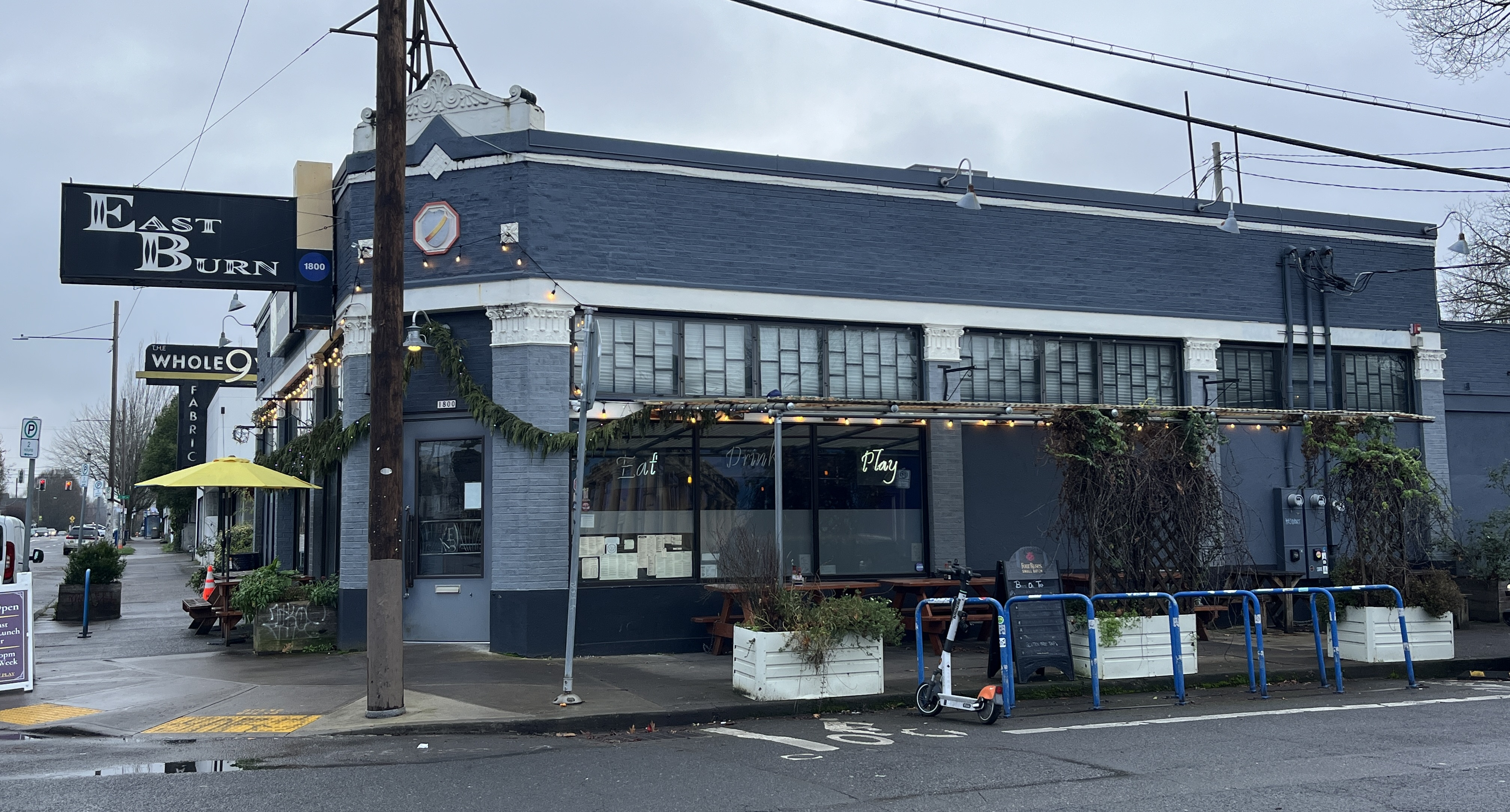
- The restaurant's exterior, 2025
- Interactive map of EastBurn

Restaurant information
- Established: 2008
- Closed: 2026
- Location: 1800 East Burnside Street, Portland, Multnomah, Oregon, 97214, United States
- Coordinates: 45.5228°N 122.6474°W
- Website: theeastburn.com

EastBurn, sometimes known as EastBurn Public House or stylized as Eastburn, was a pub and restaurant in Portland, Oregon, United States that operated from 2008 to 2026.

== Description ==
EastBurn was a pub and restaurant on East Burnside Street in southeast Portland's Buckman neighborhood. Michael Russell of The Oregonian described the restaurant as a "home for swing chairs and craft beer" with "a handful of small fire pits built into round tables in the back". According to Willamette Week's Matthew Korfhage, EastBurn was "like a bar with hidden levels—especially because it literally has a hidden level downstairs filled with skee ball and Pac-Man." He described EastBurn as a "sensitive bro-bar, comedy bar, beer-dinner bar, trash-TV bar and presidential-debate bar". The restaurant hosted book discussion club meetings, open mic shows, and comedy shows. Children were only allowed upstairs, as of 2016.

Korfhage wrote in 2016, "there's always a rare beer you didn't know about on tap or a goofball deal you'd have no reason to expect, like $2 off whiskey on Wednesday and $2.50 craft pints on Tuesday—and $3.50 craft pints during happy hour, for that matter, not to mention $3 off specialty cocktails. And during the NBA playoffs, the bar tosses out free beers when the Blazers eclipse 100 points. Every hour is happy, perhaps—but only at random."

The drink menu included whisky and, seasonally, cider. The restaurant served CBD-infused beer on tap, as of 2018.

== History ==
In 2011, EastBurn hosted a Low Country Boil, offering all-you-can-eat crawfish, potatoes, and corn, as well as beer from Eugene-based Oakshire Brewing. The restaurant served bacon cinnamon rolls and mimosas for Mother's Day in 2014. Also in 2014, owner Mike Bender pledged to donate all proceeds from the $5 grilled cheese for the month of August to the Portland Women's Crisis Line, in response to a sexist "joke" about abortion left by a Yelp reviewer.

The restaurant offered a promotion in which someone could invite nine friends on their birthday to enjoy unlimited draft beer and house wine in the basement for one hour. Only two Birthday Power Hours could be held simultaneously, and the birthday guest also received deep-fried cookie dough or a brownie. The promotion ended in 2018 because of "unruly" guests. EastBurn hosted karaoke on Sundays in the downstairs tap room at the time.

The restaurant hosted an annual costume party for Halloween. The 2018 event featured live music upstairs and a dance party in the basement. Michael Fritz was also an owner, as of 2019. EastBurn closed in 2026.

== Reception ==
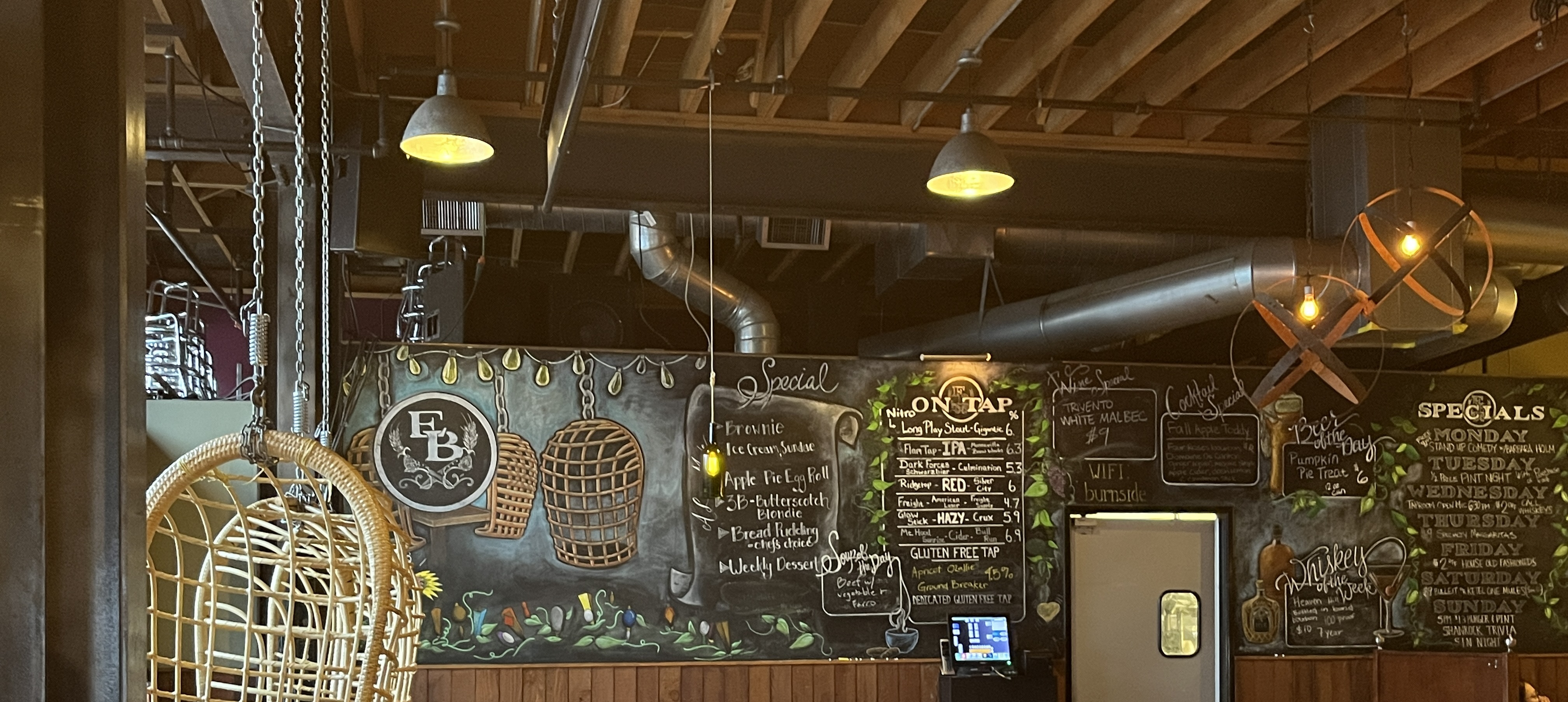
The restaurant's interior, 2025

Michael Russell included EastBurn on The Oregonian's 2016 list of "Portland's 25 coziest restaurant and bar fireplaces" and 2017 list of "Portland's 25 coziest restaurants and bars to warm up on a cold night". The restaurant also appeared in Willamette Week's 2016 lists of "Portland's Best Patio Bars for Happy Hour" and "The Best Happy Hours in Southeast Portland". EastBurn's comedy show It's Gonna Be Okay was a runner-up in the Best Comedy Night category in the newspaper's annual reader's poll in 2016. Eat This, Not That deemed EastBurn the best restaurant for heated outdoor dining in Oregon in 2022.

== See also ==
- List of defunct restaurants of the United States
