= Rumpless chickens =

Chickens with caudal dysplasia

Rumpless chickens are characterised by caudal dysplasia, the absence of the pygostyle or caudal appendage – the "parson's nose". This is the result of inheritance of an autosomal dominant trait. The mutation which causes it is unknown; two candidates have been proposed.

== History ==
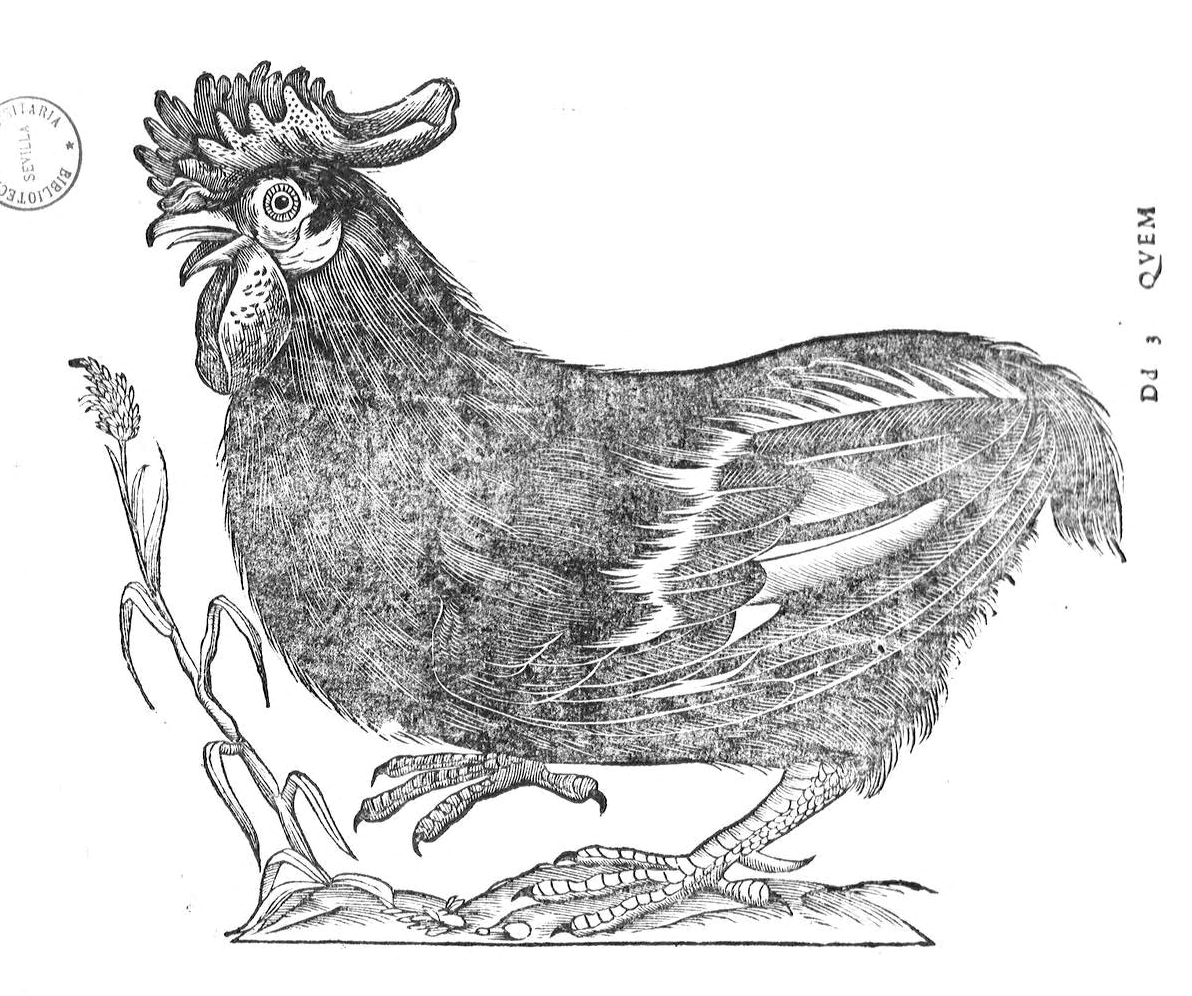
"Gallus ex Persia", illustration from the Ornithologiae Tomus Alter of Ulisse Aldrovandi, 1600

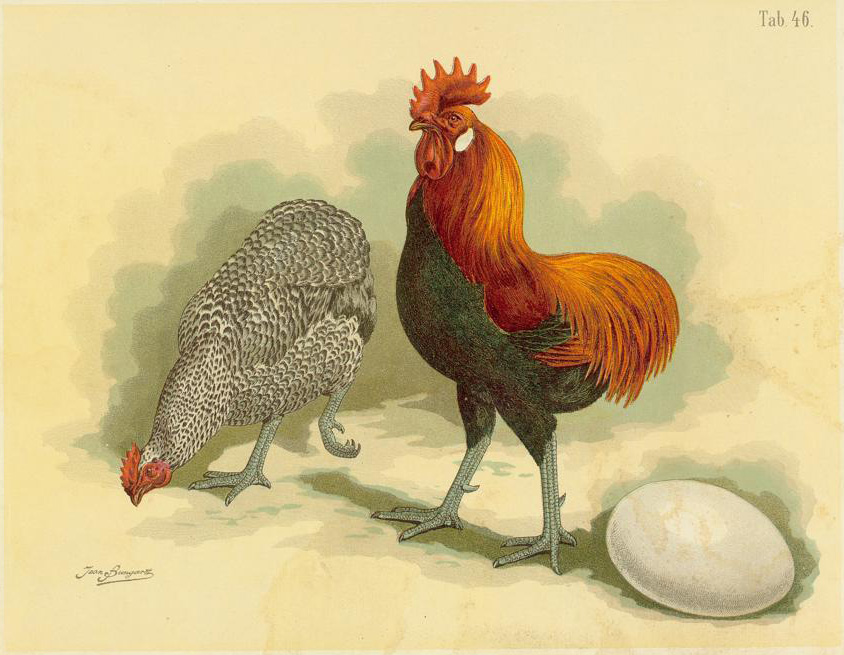
Illustration from the Geflügel-Album of Jean Bungartz, 1885

Rumplessness in chickens has been documented for centuries. An early description is that of the Bolognese ornithologist Ulisse Aldrovandi in his Ornithologiae Tomus Alter of 1600.

== Rumpless breeds ==
Rumpless breeds of chicken include: the Araucana or Rumpless Araucana of South America, both large fowl and bantam; in Europe, the Belgian Barbu de Boitsfort, Barbu de Grubbe and Barbu d'Everberg bantams, the German Ruhlaer Zwerg-Kaulhühner or Rumpless Booted Bantam and the Rumpless Game of the United Kingdom (both large fowl and bantam), sometimes called the Manx Rumpy or Persian Rumpless; and in Asia, the Japanese Uzurao, a rumpless equivalent of the Tosa-Kojidori bantam, and Ingie (large fowl) from Kagoshima Prefecture, and the Piao of Yunnan Province in China.
