= Monte Carlo (restaurant) =

Defunct Italian restaurant in Portland, Oregon, U.S.

- Interactive map of Monte Carlo

Restaurant information
- Food type: Italian
- Location: Portland, Multnomah, Oregon, United States
- Coordinates: 45.5154°N 122.6551°W

Monte Carlo was an Italian restaurant in Portland, Oregon, United States. It was established in 1927, and was one of the city's first Italian restaurants. The restaurant operated on southeast Portland's Belmont Street for approximately 70 years, before owner John DiGregorio relocated the business to Gresham. The restaurant closed soon after, and the building that had housed the business on Belmont Street was destroyed in a fire in 2002. The site of the Belmont restaurant later became the Goat Blocks. Monte Carlo had karaoke. The menu included minestrone and steak.

== See also ==
- List of Italian restaurants
