= Fathom (art installation) =

Art installation in Portland, Oregon, U.S.

- Year: 2024
- Location: Portland, Oregon, United States; 45.5193°N 122.6758°W

Fathom (stylized as FATHOM) was an underwater-themed, immersive art installation located in Portland, Oregon, United States. The installation launched in February 2024 and closed in July 2025. Fathom showcased the work of approximately 100 artists and volunteers and drew inspiration from other immersive art experiences such as Meow Wolf.

Many of the artworks were previously exhibited at the Portland Winter Light Festival, Burning Man, Symbiosis, and Maker Faire. The interactive nature of Fathom allowed visitors to engage with art pieces through buttons that triggered sounds, lighting, and movement.

== Description ==
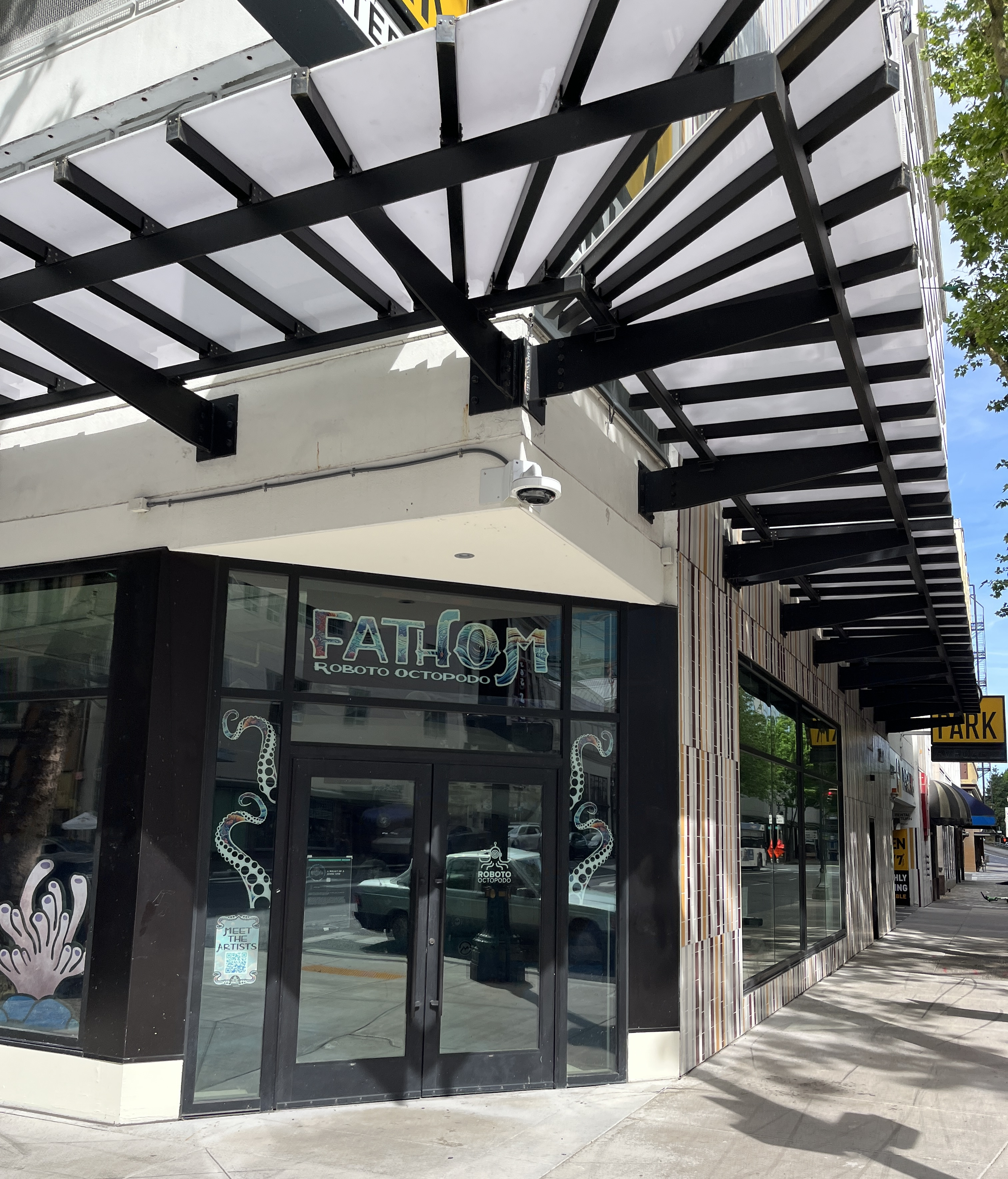
Entrance to the building that housed Fathom, May 2026

Fathom was designed to be fully interactive. According to co-founder Tyler FuQua, visitors received clipboards to engage in "research" that included a scavenger hunt within the space. Unlike traditional art exhibits, where touching is often prohibited, Fathom encouraged tactile exploration of its installations. Chris Herring noted that the design process was influenced by companies like Meow Wolf, with advice emphasizing the importance of creating art for personal enjoyment rather than targeting specific audiences.

== History ==
Fathom was created by founding members — Tyler FuQua, Chris Herring, Jason Hutchinson, Kevin Kearns, and Jean Margaret Thomas — who established the limited liability company Roboto Octopodo to manage the installation's production. The exhibit premiered during the Portland Winter Light Festival in February 2024. Initially free to attend, Fathom closed for two months to expand and develop a ticketed experience starting in May 2024. Over 100 volunteer artists contributed to the installation, often using found and donated materials. The City of Portland has renewed Fathom's permit twice, with the current extension lasting until February 28, 2025. Another extension lasted until July 27.

== Reception and impact ==
Fathom garnered media attention from both local and national outlets, including Oregon Public Radio, Willamette Week, and local television stations. It was named a “Best of Portland” 2024 Editorial Pick by Willamette Week. Fathom was situated in a downtown Portland neighborhood described as struggling, and it has transformed 8,000 square feet of a former drugstore into an immersive oceanic environment. Local businesses reported positive impacts after the installation opened.

== See also ==
- 2024 in art
- Coraline's Curious Cat Trail (2024), another temporary art installation in Portland
- Culture of Portland, Oregon
- Hopscotch (art experience), another immersive art experience in Portland
- Installation art
