= Easter egger =

Hybrid chicken

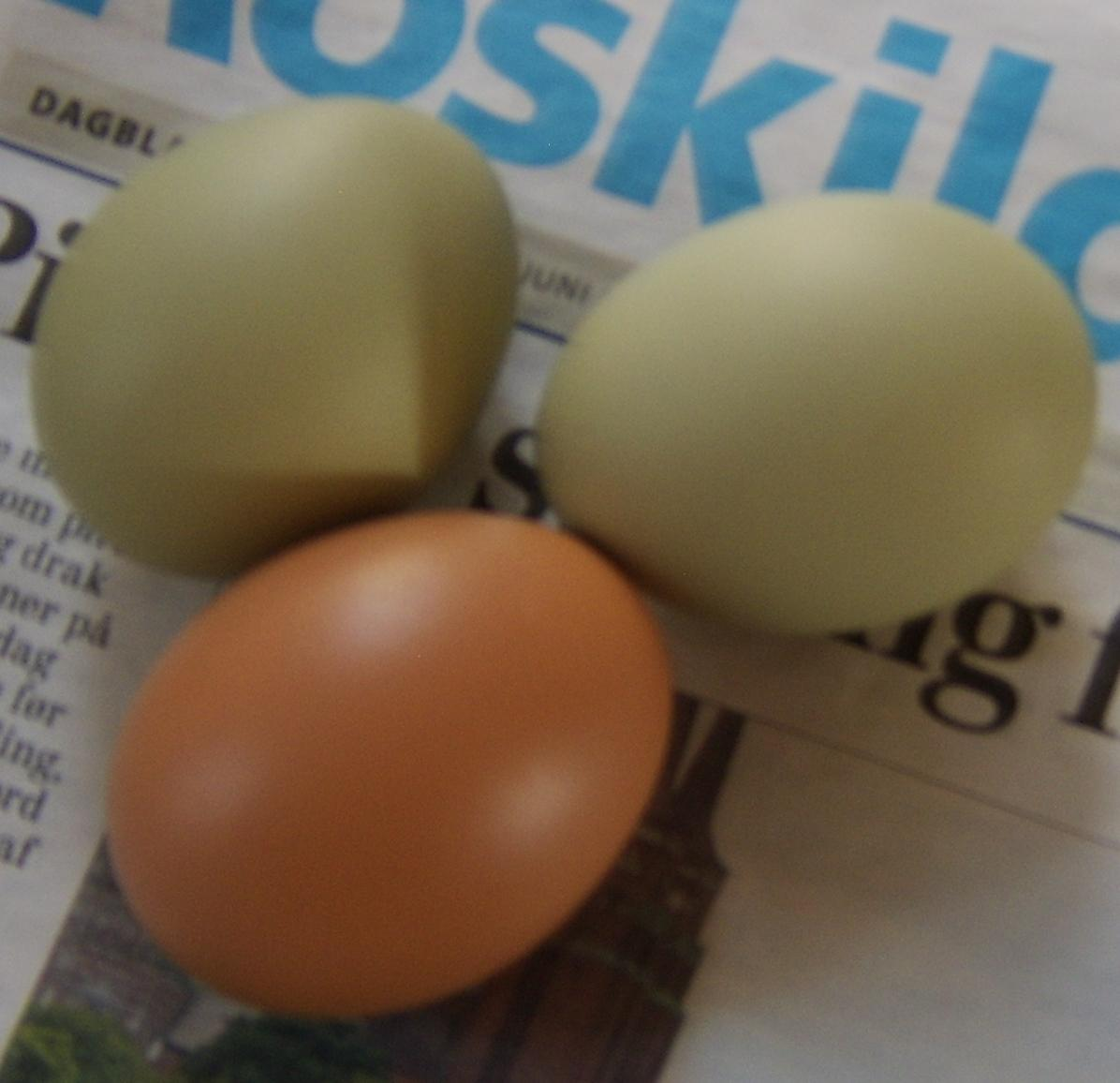
Eggs from an Olive egger compared to a brown ISA Warren egg

In American usage, an Easter egger or Easter-egger is any hybrid or mixed-breed chicken resulting from the breeding of a bird carrying the blue egg (oocyan) gene with one that lays brown eggs. Eggs from such a bird may be any shade of blue or brown, or occasionally pink or pale yellow. These birds do not constitute a breed, and so are not recognized by the American Poultry Association or the American Bantam Association. They may be marketed as "Americana", but are quite different from the Ameraucana, a recognized breed.

== Characteristics ==
Hybrid birds of this type may be of any color. They are commonly muffed and bearded, often with a pea-comb; the wattles may be small or absent. The legs can be grey, yellow, or greenish.

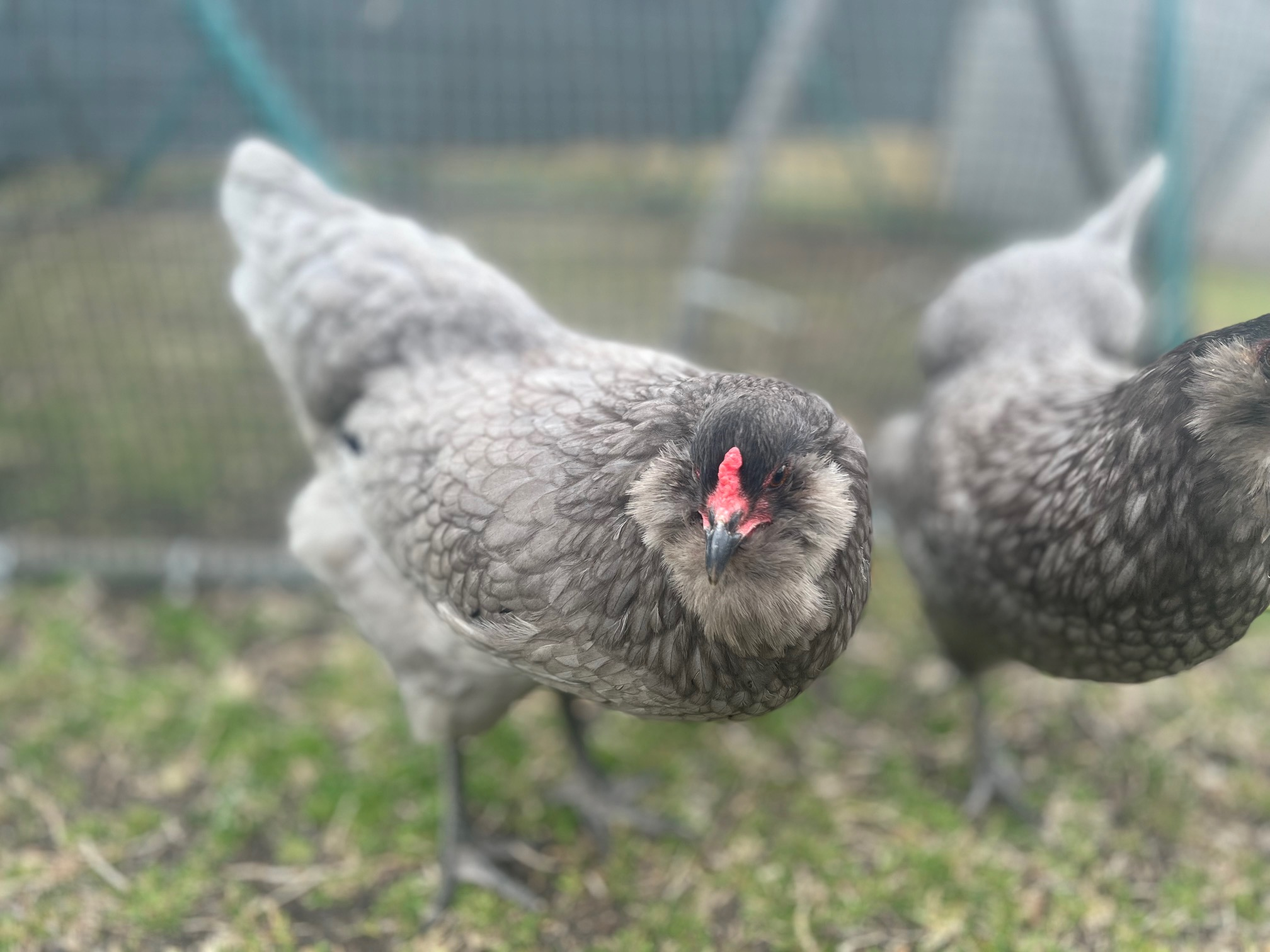

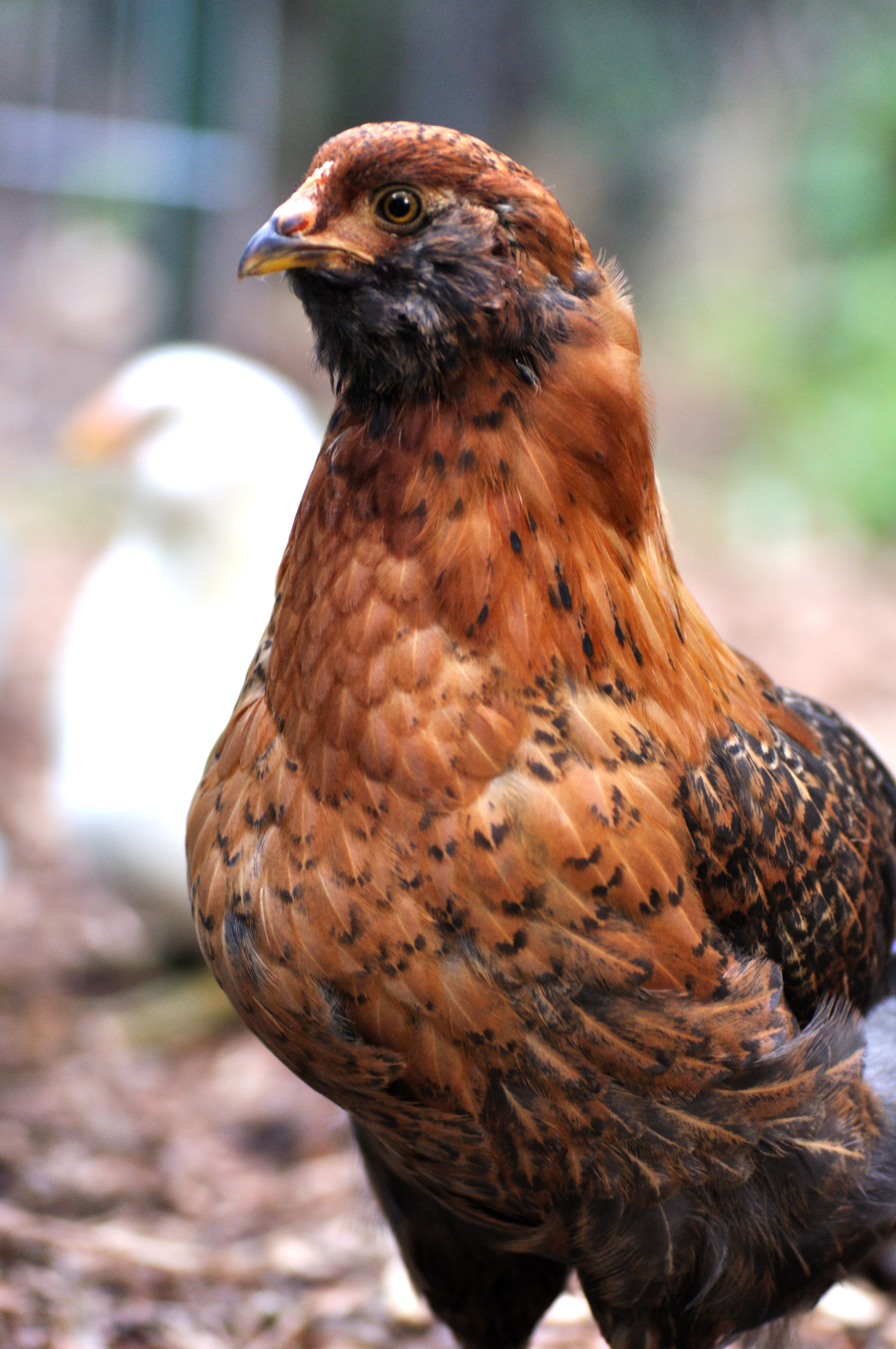

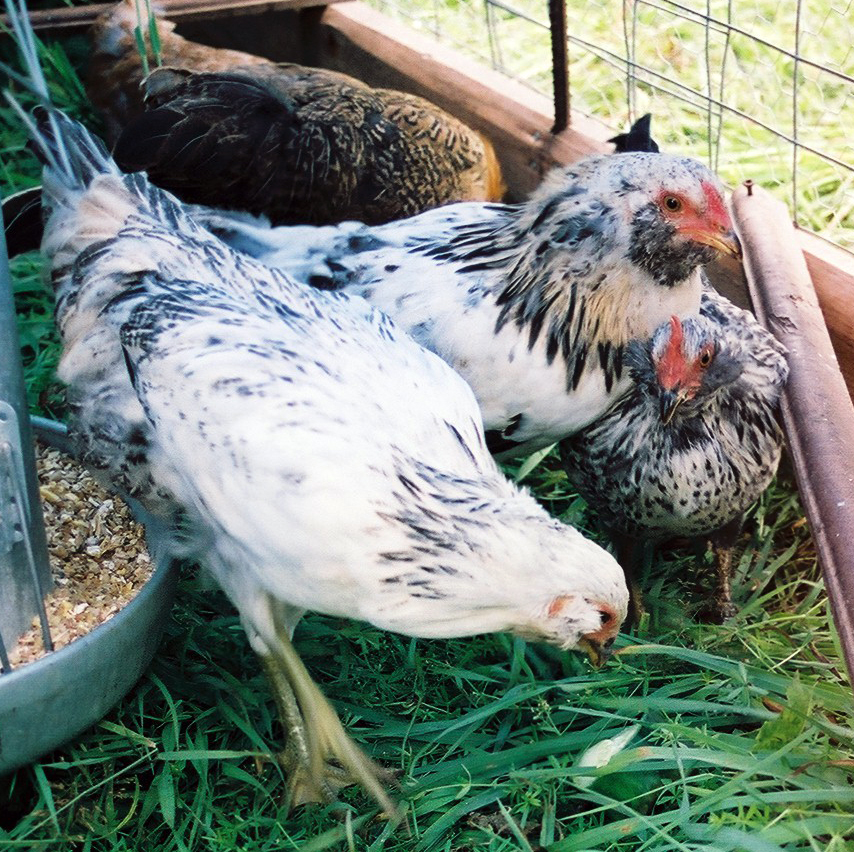

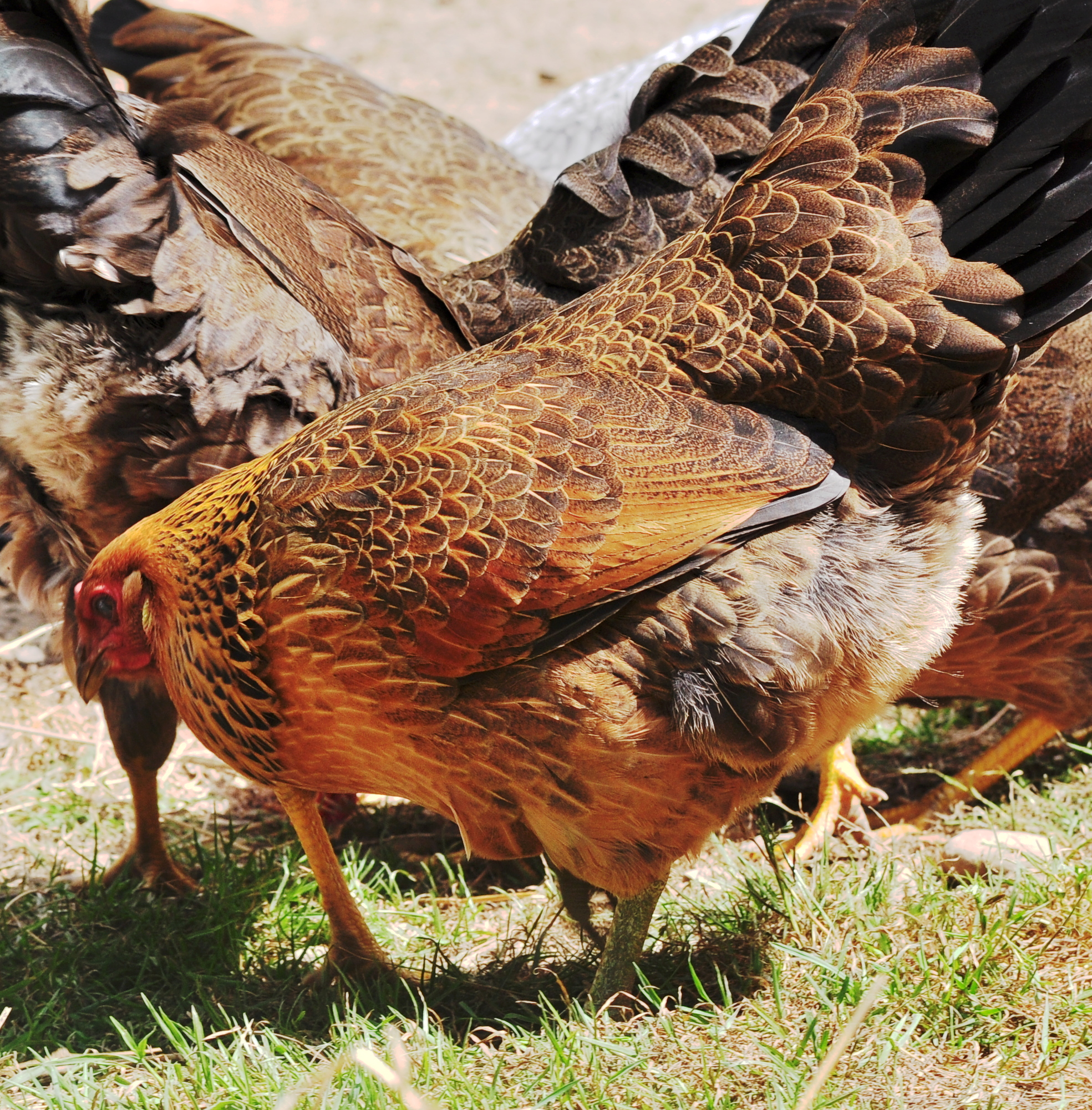
