= Ameraucana =

American breed of chicken

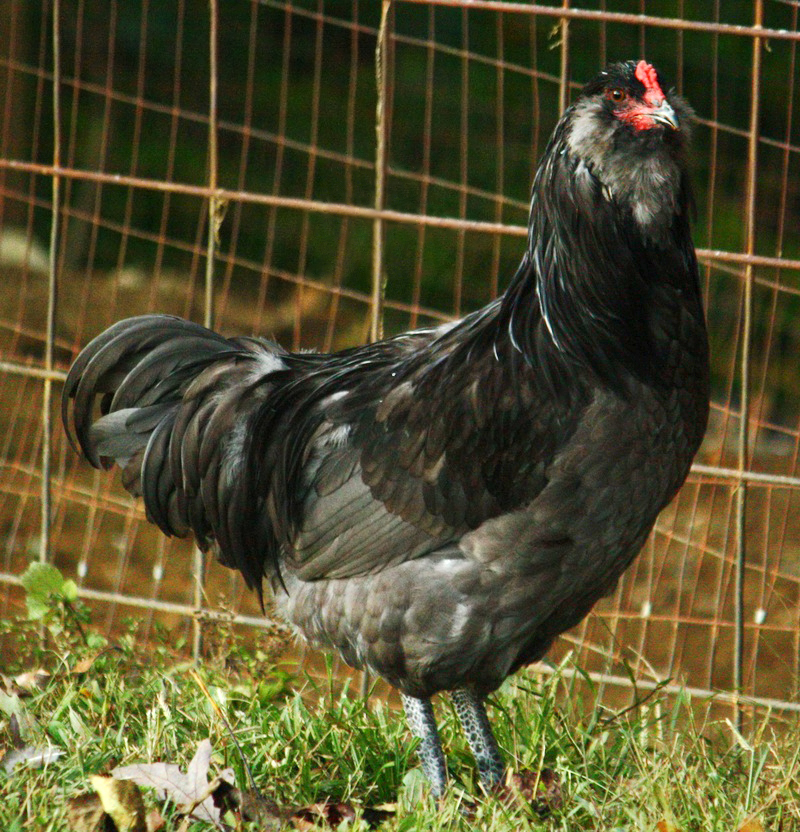
- A blue cock
- Country of origin: United States
- Standard: APA (abridged)

Traits
- Weight: Male: Standard: 5.5–6.5 lb (2.5–2.9 kg); Bantam: 26–30 oz (740–850 g); Female: Standard: 4.5–5.5 lb (2.0–2.5 kg); Bantam: 24–26 oz (680–740 g)
- Egg color: blue in various shades
- Comb type: pea

Classification
- APA: All other standard breeds
- ABA: All other comb clean legged
- EE: yes
- PCGB: not listed
- Chicken; Gallus gallus domesticus

The Ameraucana is an American breed of domestic chicken. It was developed in the United States in the 1970s, and derives from Araucana chickens brought from Chile. It was bred to retain the blue-egg gene but eliminate the lethal alleles of the parent breed. There are both standard-sized and bantam versions.

== History ==
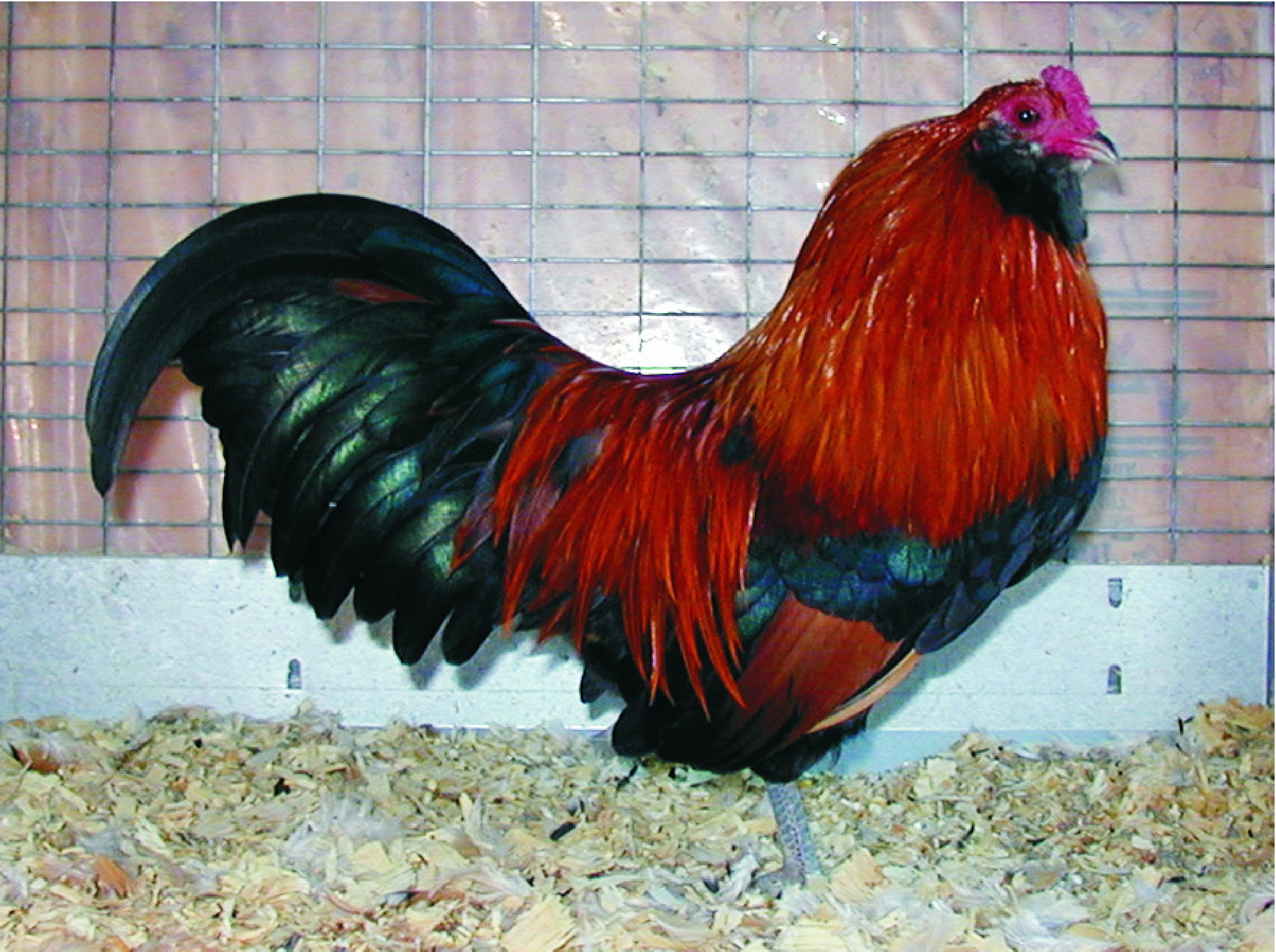
Wheaten bantam cock

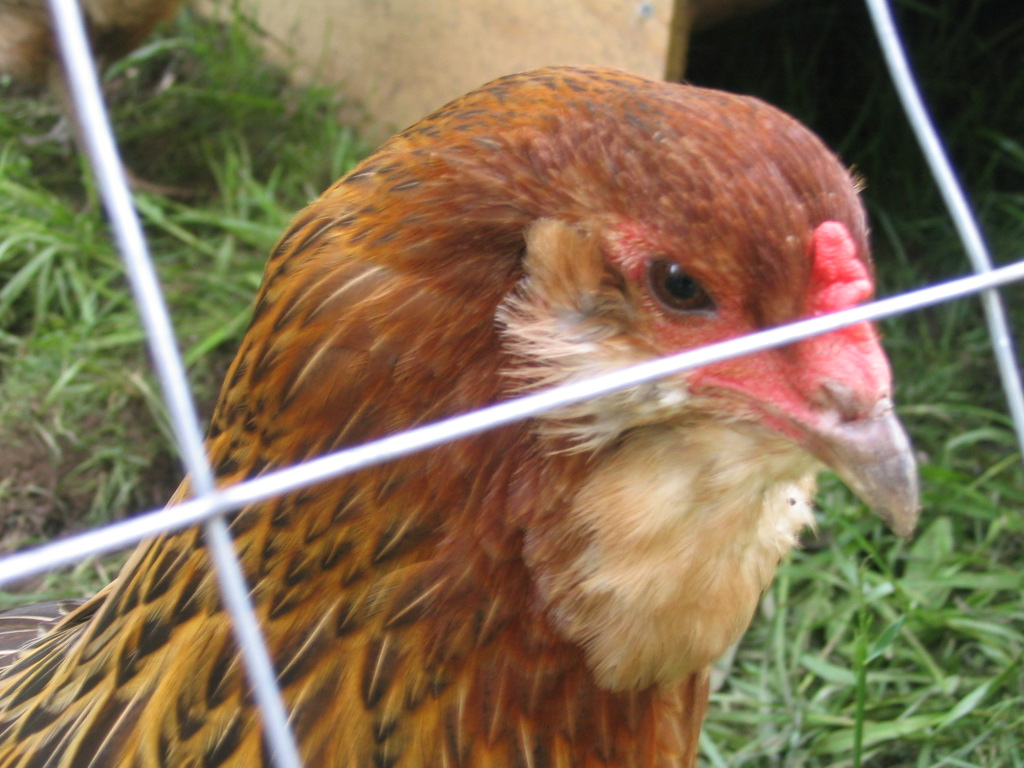
A hen bird

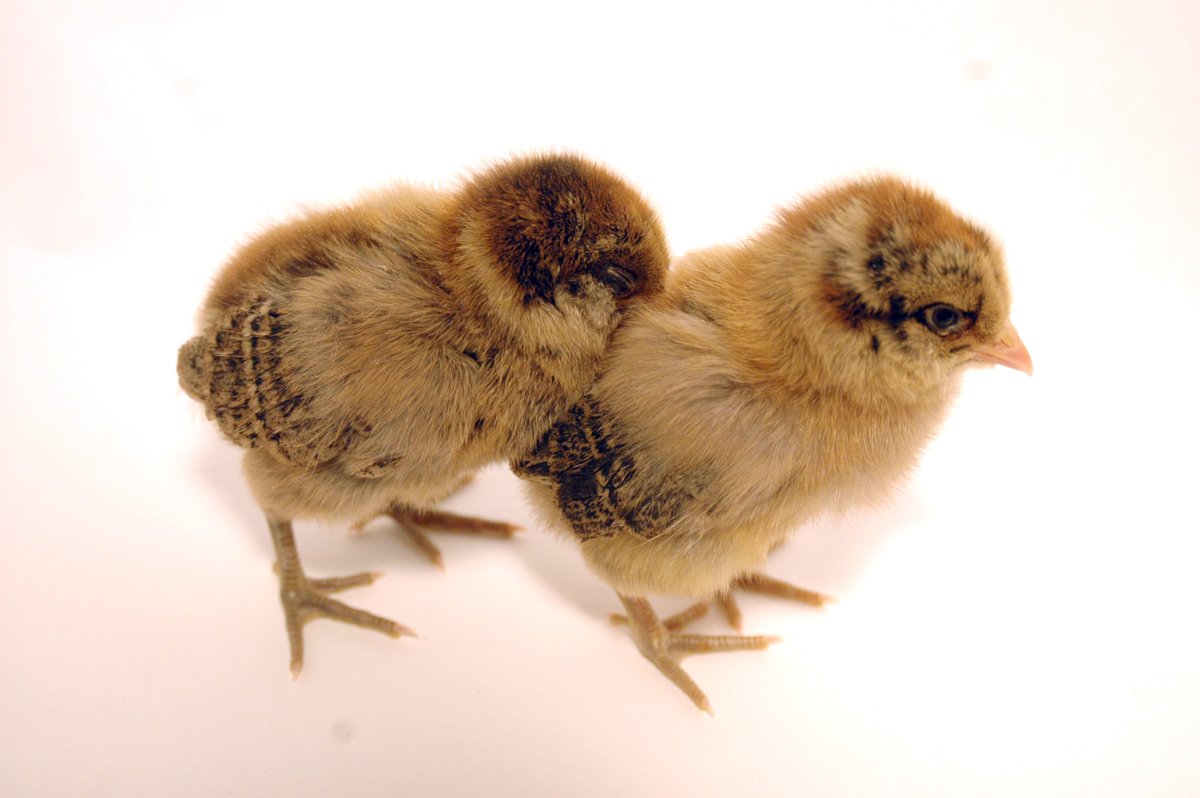
Two chicks

The Ameraucana was developed in the United States in the 1970s from Araucana chickens brought from Chile. It was bred to retain the unusual blue-egg gene of the Araucana, but eliminate the tufted and rumpless lethal alleles of the parent breed. It was added to the Standard of Perfection of the American Poultry Association in 1984. The name derives from "America" and "Araucana".

The Ameraucana is recognized in the United States as a separate breed from the Araucana. In some other countries, including Australia and the United Kingdom, both the tailed and rumpless variants of the Araucana are considered a single breed.

== Characteristics ==
The Ameraucana is one of the few chicken breeds to lay blue eggs. It shows many similarities to the Araucana, including the pea comb and the blue egg gene. It is tailed, muffed and bearded, whereas the Araucana in the United States has ear tufts and is rumpless. The earlobes are small and round, the wattles small or absent; earlobes, comb and wattles are all red. The shanks are slate-blue, tending to black in the black plumage variant.

Eight color variants are recognized in the American Standard of Perfection: black, blue, blue wheaten, brown red, buff, silver, wheaten and white.
