= Goat Blocks =

Mixed-use development in Portland, Oregon, U.S.

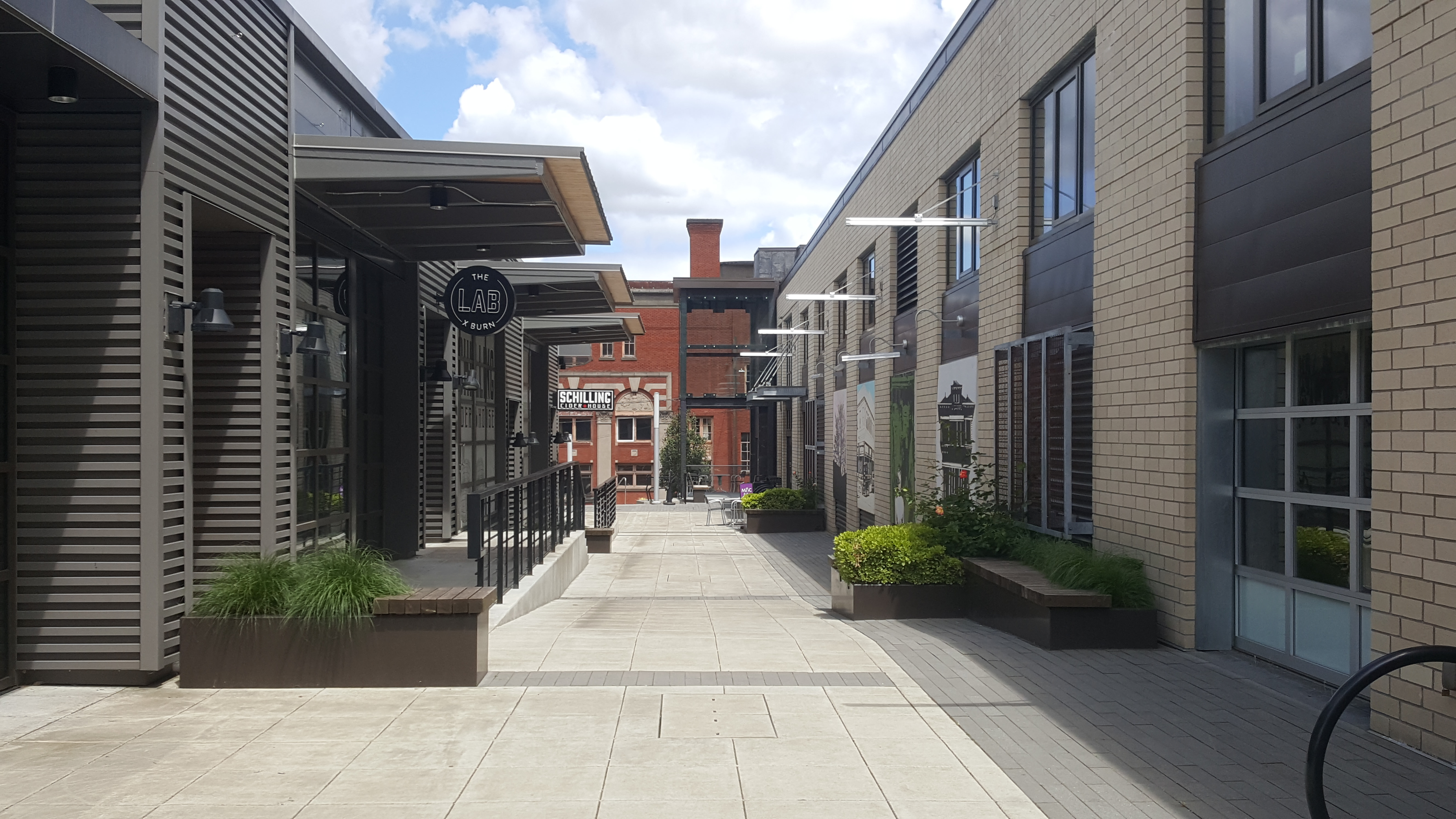
- Upper level, 2021
- Interactive map of Goat Blocks
- Location: Portland, Oregon, United States
- Coordinates: 45°30′58″N 122°39′17.5″W

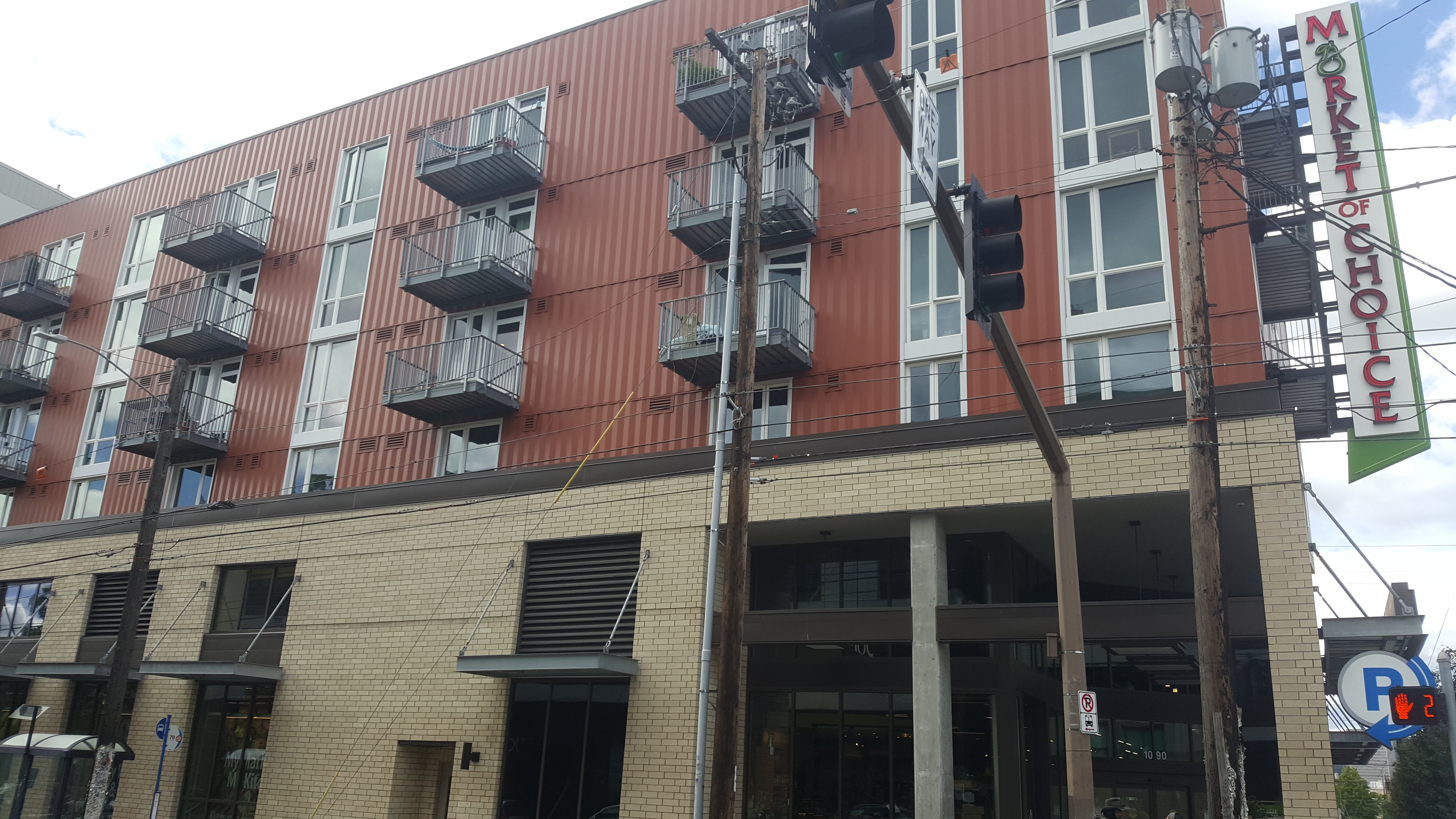
Market of Choice, 2021

Goat Blocks is a mixed-use development in Portland, Oregon, United States.

The complex was built on a 2-acre field which was previously home to the Italian restaurant Monte Carlo, and later a herd of goats, known as the "Belmont Goats".

Killian Pacific's development project includes a grocery store (Market of Choice), a hardware store, and an apartment complex. The non-alcoholic pop-up restaurant Suckerpunch operated at the Goat Blocks in 2022.
