= Belmont Goats =

Herd of goats in Portland, Oregon, U.S.

The Belmont Goats are a herd of goats in Portland, Oregon. Previously, the goats occupied the site of the mixed-use development known as the Goat Blocks. The goats have had to move locations many times since being moved from their original location. The Belmont Goats are now a nonprofit, founded to help care for the goats.
