= Gabbiano's =

Restaurant in Portland, Oregon, U.S.

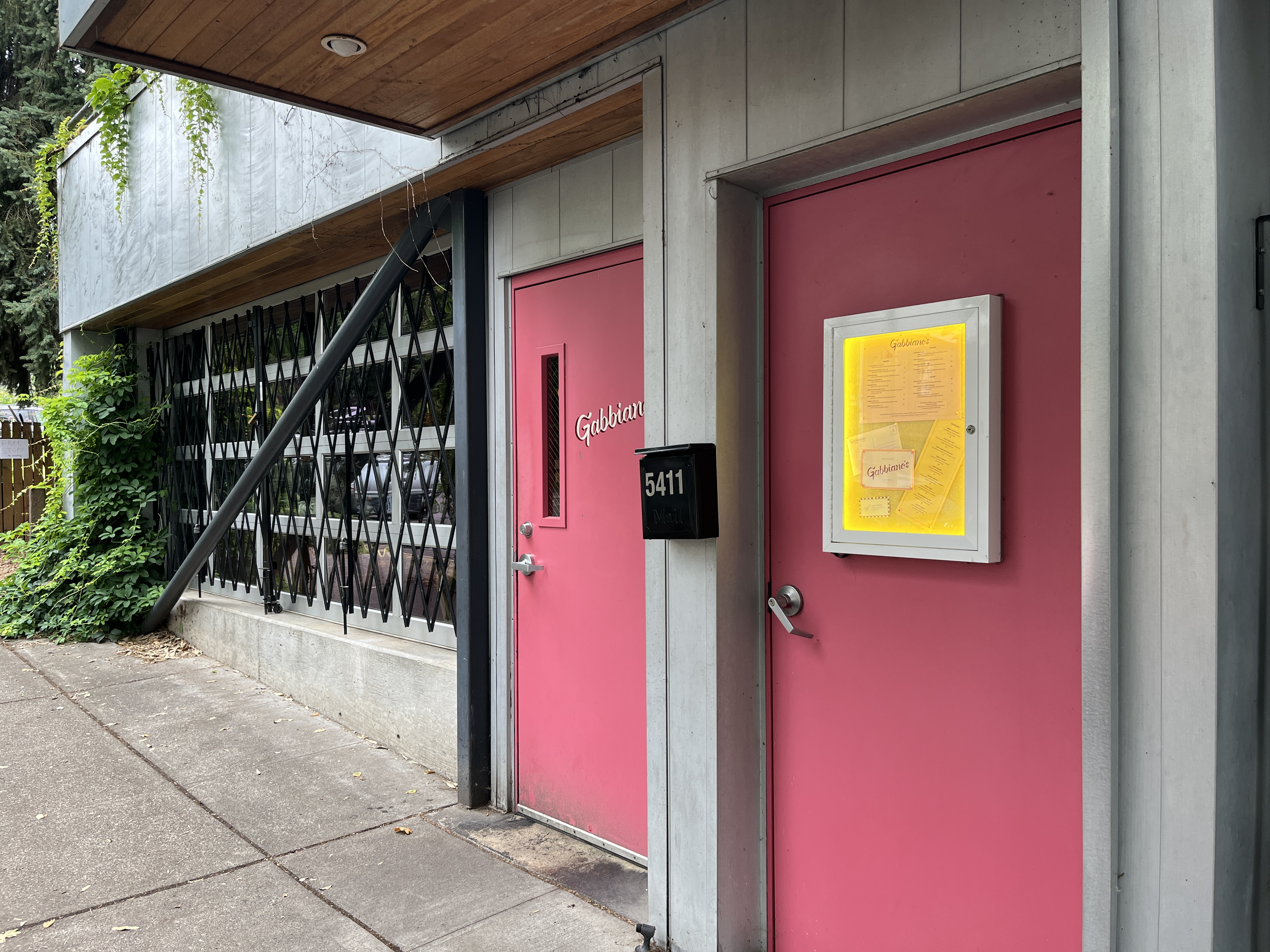
- The restaurant's exterior, 2026
- Interactive map of Gabbiano's

Restaurant information
- Established: January 12, 2022
- Owners: Blake Foster; David Sigal
- Head chef: Liz Serrone
- Food type: Italian-American
- Location: 5411 Northeast 30th Avenue, Portland, Multnomah, Oregon, 97211, United States
- Coordinates: 45.5623049°N 122.63502°W
- Website: gabbianospdx.com

Gabbiano's is an Italian-American restaurant in Portland, Oregon, in the United States. Blake Foster and David Sigal opened the restaurant in northeast Portland's Concordia neighborhood in January 2022.

Gabbiano's was named one of the city's best new restaurants of 2022 by The Oregonian. It has garnered a positive reception and has been described as one of Portland's "essential" restaurants and best Italian establishments by Eater Portland.

== Description ==
The Italian-American restaurant Gabbiano's—its name originating from the Italian word for "seagull" and a play on the last name of one of the owners—operates at the intersection of 30th and Killingsworth in northeast Portland's Concordia neighborhood. The interior has hand-painted Italian frescos and photographs of pasta displayed on walls, as well as wooden bistro chairs. The patio has a pergola, and the restaurant uses red-and-white checkered tablecloths.

The menu includes chicken parmesan, marsala with duck, mozzarella sticks, mushroom ragu pappardelle, ricotta gnocchi with confit chicken, fried calamari, a Caesar salad, and panna cotta. The squid ink pasta has crab meat, mint, and brown butter. The chitarra pasta dish has a red sauce and the option of meatballs. The restaurant's version of a lemon drop has lemon-infused vodka, saffron limoncello, lemon juice, and lemon salt. The New York sour has Lewis and Clark bourbon whiskey from Hood River, oregano syrup, oregano oil, and a float of lambrusco. Gabbiano's also serves cocktails, including an espresso martini as well as natural wines.

== History ==
Blake Foster and David Sigal opened Gabbiano's on January 12, 2022, in the space that previously housed Yakuza. The staff included Daniel Pickens-Jones and chef Daniel Rehbein. The business supported the 2023 Portland Association of Teachers strike, participating in fundraising efforts. For New Year's Eve, the restaurant hosted a six-course dinner with cioppino, timpano, sparkling wine, and champagne at midnight. Liz Serrone is the head chef, as of 2024.

== Reception ==
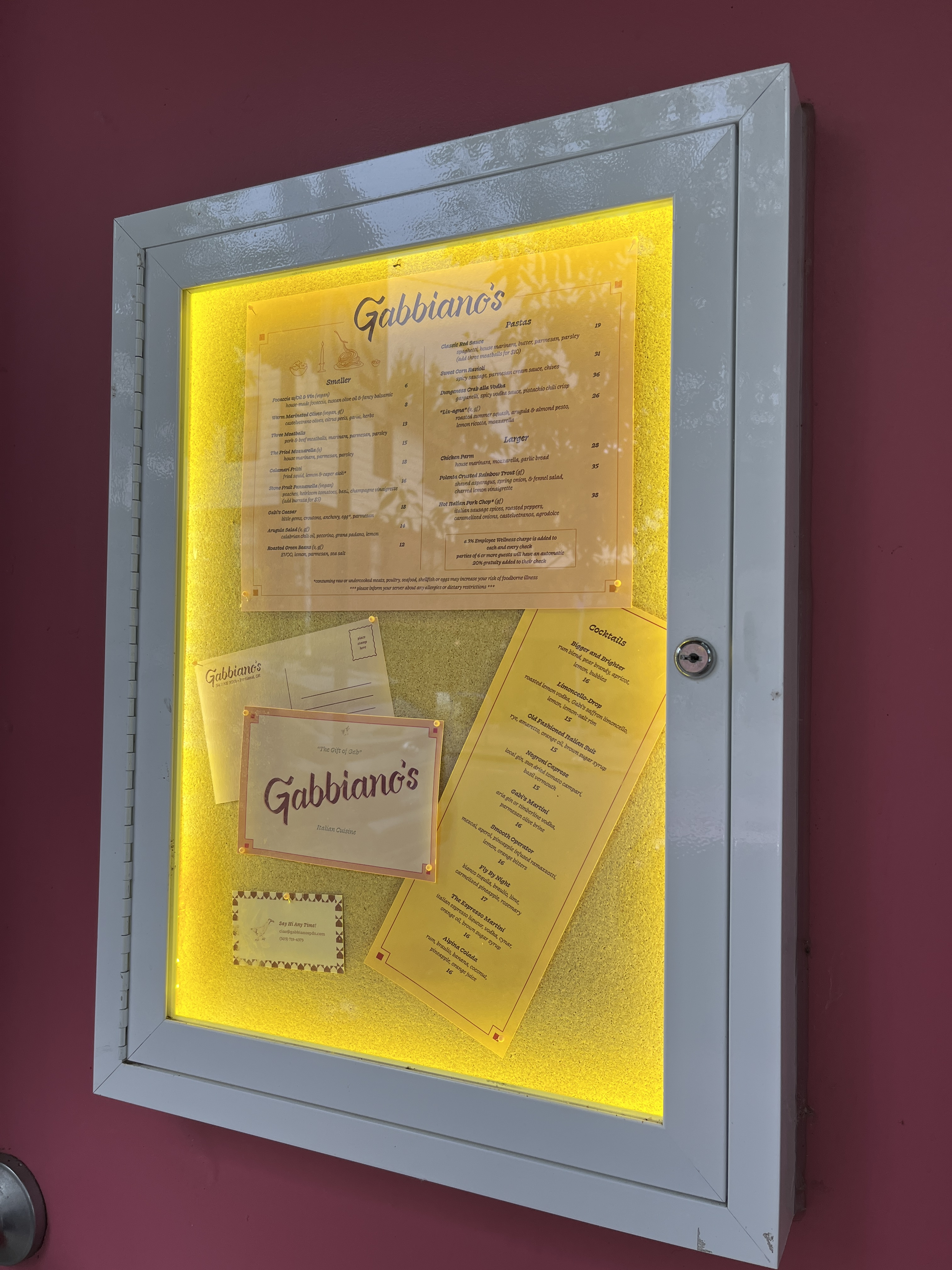
Menu, 2026

Michael Russell ranked Gabbiano's fifth on The Oregonian's list of Portland's best new restaurants of 2022. He recommended the mozzarella cups, spaghetti and meatballs, and Old Fashioned, and wrote, "After years of COVID restrictions, Gabbiano's feels like a release, and a perfect date spot for 2022." He later ranked the restaurant 26th in the newspaper's 2024 list of Portland's 40 best eateries. Gabbiano's ranked fourth in the best pasta restaurants category of The Oregonian's annual readers choice awards in 2024. Katherine Chew Hamilton included the restaurant in Portland Monthly's list of five eateries in the city for "reenacting romantic movie scenes", recommending the spaghetti and meatballs and referencing the 1955 animated film Lady and the Tramp. Andrea Damewood of Willamette Week said the restaurant's menu "could please everyone from a picky kid to a picky traditionalist to a picky gourmand".

Tasting Table included the espresso martini in a 2022 list of the twelve best in the U.S. and described Gabbiano's as "a funky, hip, and modern homage to Italian-American red sauce joints, complete with comfort food and spiffy mixed drinks". Eater Portland included the business in 2024 lists of 38 "essential" eateries in Portland as well as "stellar" Italian establishments in the city. The website's Asia Alvarez and Brooke Jackson-Glidden also included Gabbiano's in a 2024 overview of "foolproof first date spots for every kind of Portlander". Jackson-Glidden has said, "Liz Serrone of Gabbiano's designed a menu with things like Bolognese-smothered fries, jalapeño popper arancini, and banana pudding tiramisu — an Italian-infused Americana that, while unpretentious, is hard to find elsewhere in town." Gabbiano's was also included in the website's 2025 list of Portland's best Italian restaurants.

== See also ==
- List of Italian restaurants
