= Farina Bakery =

Bakery in Portland, Oregon, U.S.

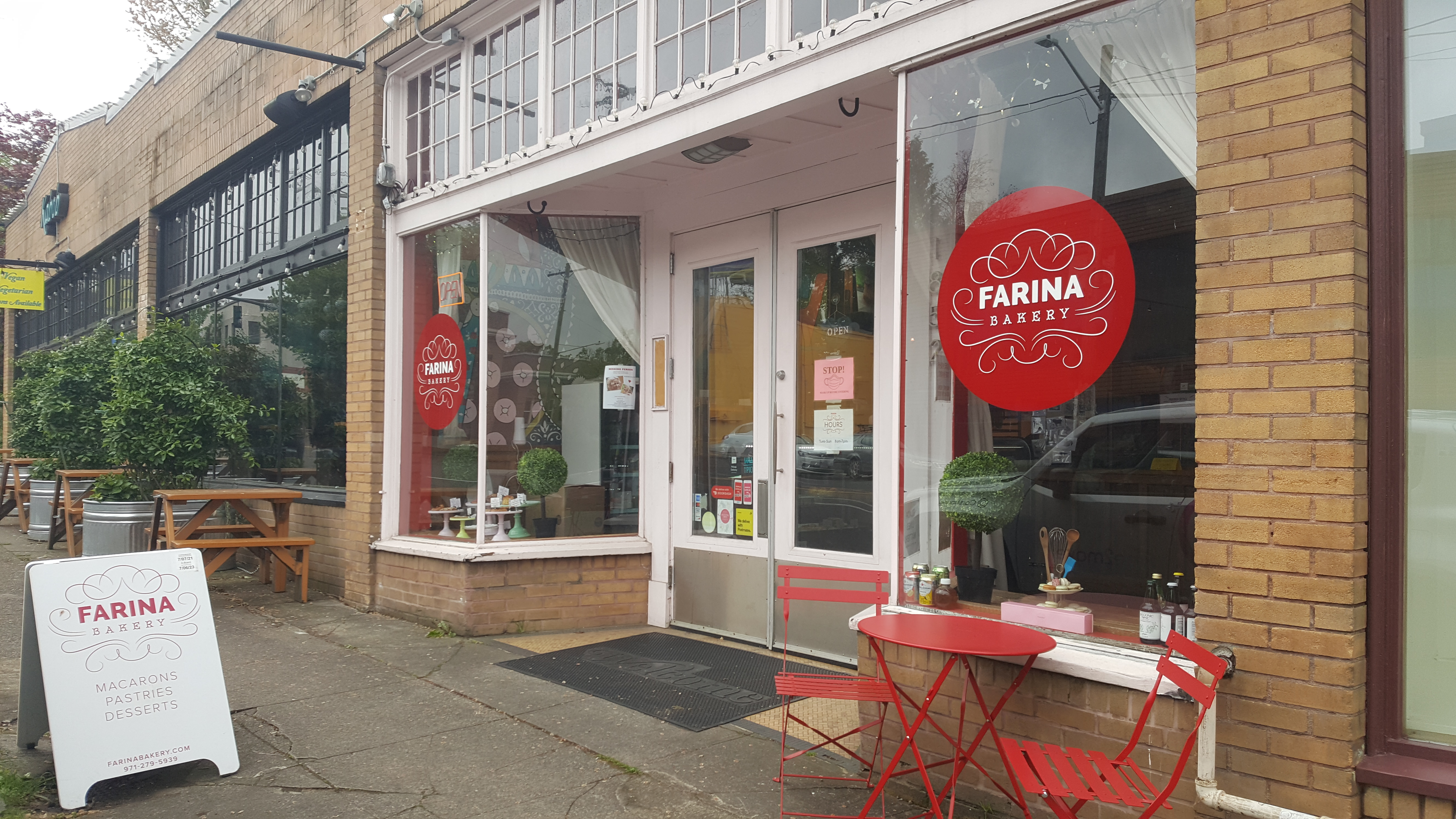
- The bakery's exterior, 2022
- Interactive map of Farina Bakery

Restaurant information
- Location: 1852 Southeast Hawthorne Boulevard, Portland, Multnomah, Oregon, 97214, United States
- Coordinates: 45.5120°N 122.6465°W
- Website: farinabakery.com

Farina Bakery is a bakery and cafe in Portland, Oregon, United States.

== Description ==
Farina Bakery is a bakery and cafe on Hawthorne Boulevard in southeast Portland's Hosford-Abernethy neighborhood. The website's Alex Frane has called the business a pâtisserie. The menu has included biscuits, cakes, cookies, macarons, and other pastries. Macarons have Italian buttercream or chocolate ganache; flavors have included caramel, chocolate hazelnut, and pistachio. Seasonal varieties have included candy cane, cranberry apple, and gingerbread.

According to Michelle Lopez of Eater Portland, "The SE Hawthorne store has a rustic, woodsy feel, a collection of quaint mismatched seats and tables, and a colorful mural for cheer." The Oregonian's Samantha Bakall said of the mural: "The most eye-catching part of the bakery is the apron murals on the walls. Painted by Daniella Repas with help from Repas' mom, sister and aunt, the murals represent many of the aprons worn by members of Farina's family."

== History ==
Farina opened in November 2014, in a space which had previously housed Sel Gris and Otto. Laura Farina is the pastry chef. Farina has supplied pastries to the cafe at the headquarters of Literary Arts, Inc.

== Reception ==
Prior to the cafe's opening, Erin DeJesus of Eater Portland called Farina Bakery a "wholesale macaron-maker whose treats are considered among the best in town". The website's Michelle Lopez included the business in a 2019 list of "11 Cake Shops in Portland for Any Occasion". She and Kara Stokes included the maracons in a 2019 overview of "Portland's Most Unforgettable Cookies", writing: "No cookie map would be complete without an entry for the city's best macarons, and in Portland, it's extremely hard to beat those at the cozy and quaint Farina Bakery."

In 2021, the website's Alex France recommended Farnia for Valentine's Day dining. Thom Hilton and Michelle DeVona included Farina in Eater Portland's 2022 overview of "Where to Eat and Drink in Portland's Hawthorne District". The authors wrote: "Portland's own little Laduree, this French bakery's standout treats are the delicately-crafted, vibrantly-colored macarons, lined up to go in Wes Andersonian pink boxes. Signature flavors of the creamy and crackly sandwich cookies include earl grey and animal cracker, alongside rotating seasonal flavors like ube, honey lavender, and mulled wine. Looking beyond, Farina also offers some of the city's most comforting breakfast treats, from a marionberry-filled pastry mimicking a Pop-Tart to raspberry-pistachio scones with white chocolate drizzle." Pete Cottell of Willamette Week included Farina in a 2018 list of "Eight Must-Have Munchies For When You're Stoned and Starving".

== See also ==
- List of bakeries
