= Kate's Ice Cream =

Company based in Portland, Oregon, U.S.

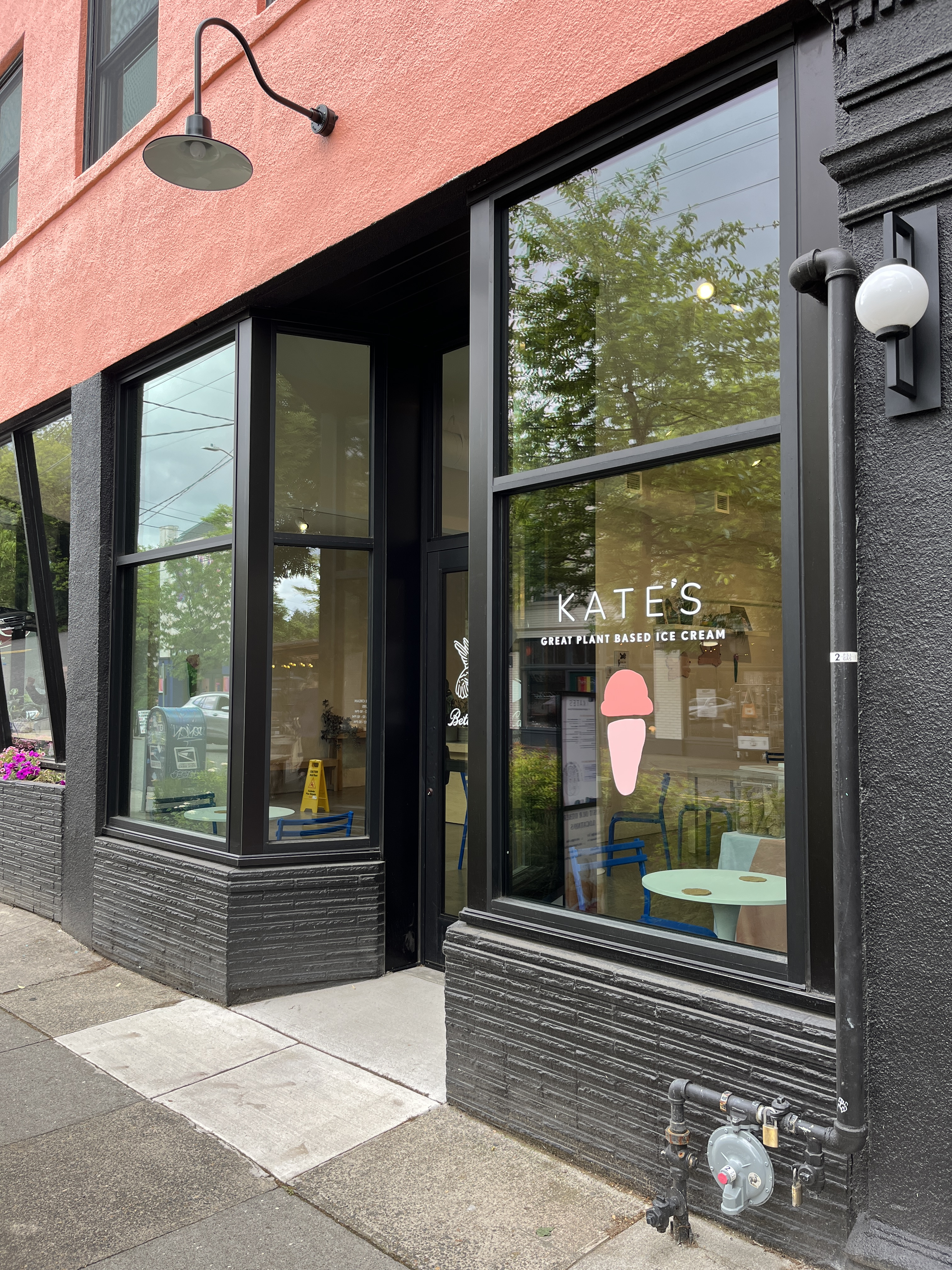
- Exterior of the shop in southeast Portland, Oregon, 2025
- Interactive map of Kate's Ice Cream

Restaurant information
- Location: 3713 North Mississippi Avenue, Portland, Multnomah, Oregon, 97227, United States
- Coordinates: 45.5498°N 122.6758°W
- Website: katesicecream.com

Kate's Ice Cream is a gluten-free, plant-based ice cream company based in Portland, Oregon, United States.

== Description ==
Kate's Ice Cream uses organic coconut milk and cashew milk. Gluten-free and vegan ice cream varieties include cookies and cream, marionberry cobbler, rosewater cardamom almond, salted peanut butter brittle, triple chocolate brownie, vanilla, and lemon blueberry cheesecake, which has blueberry jam and graham cracker crust. Kate's also serves brownie sundaes, choco tacos, ice cream cake, and ice cream sandwiches.

Kate's has also served seasonal ice cream varieties such as chocolate peppermint.

== History ==
Owner Katelyn Williams launched Kate's Ice Cream in 2019, initially selling at the farmers' market on the Portland State University campus in downtown Portland. The business later operated as a pop-up on Northeast Sandy Boulevard, before the first brick and mortar location on Mississippi Avenue, in the north Portland part of the Boise neighborhood.

A second shop opened on 23rd Avenue in northwest Portland's Northwest District in 2024, in the space previously occupied by Westward Whiskey.

== Reception ==
Writers for Axios Portland included Kate's in a 2023 overview of the city's best vegan ice cream. Portland Monthly included the business in a 2024 overview of the city's best ice cream. Waz Wu and Rebecca Roland included Kate's in Eater Portland's 2024 list of the city's sixteen "essential" vegan and vegetarian restaurants. In 2025, writers included the business in the website's overviews of the city's eighteen best vegan and vegetarian restaurants and best dairy-free frozen desserts.

== See also ==
- List of ice cream brands
