= G-Love (restaurant) =

Restaurant in Portland, Oregon, U.S.

- Interactive map of G-Love

Restaurant information
- Established: 2019
- Owner: Garrett Benedict
- Chef: Garrett Benedict
- Food type: New American
- Location: 1615 Northwest 21st Avenue, Portland, Multnomah, Oregon, 97209, United States
- Coordinates: 45.5343°N 122.6949°W
- Seating capacity: 50–52
- Website: g-lovepdx.com

G-Love is a New American restaurant in Portland, Oregon, in the United States. Chef Garrett Benedict opened the restaurant in the Slabtown area of northwest Portland's Northwest District in 2019. Described as a "reverse steakhouse", G-Love has a vegetable-focused menu and has garnered a positive reception.

== Description ==
G-Love is a vegetable-focused restaurant in the Slabtown area of northwest Portland's Northwest District. It operates in the ground floor of the Carson apartment complex and seats approximately 50–52 people. Thom Hilton of Eater Portland has described the restaurant as a "produce-heavy, super-seasonal 'reverse steakhouse'" and "home to one of Portland's most personal and immersive dining experiences".

The New American menu features small plates and has included hanger steak, ribollita bean stew, braised mushrooms, a "crusty" avocado appetizer, the Ensalata Bomba, and a cocktail called the Betty.

== History ==
Established in 2019, the restaurant is owned by chef Garrett Benedict. "G-Love" is his childhood nickname. In 2024, Benedict opened the cocktail bar Love Shack next door.

== Reception ==
In 2019, Willamette Week said, "Portland's first 'reverse steakhouse' puts veggies in the spotlight and relegates meat to sideshow status, which isn't the novel idea around these parts owner and chef Garrett Benedict seems to think it is—but items such as the craveable Ensalata Bomba are delicious enough to justify the restaurant's existence, regardless of the concept." Writers for Portland Monthly included the Crusty Avocado in a 2025 list of the city's "most iconic" dishes.

== See also ==
- List of New American restaurants
