= House wine =

Typically cheap wine on a restaurant menu

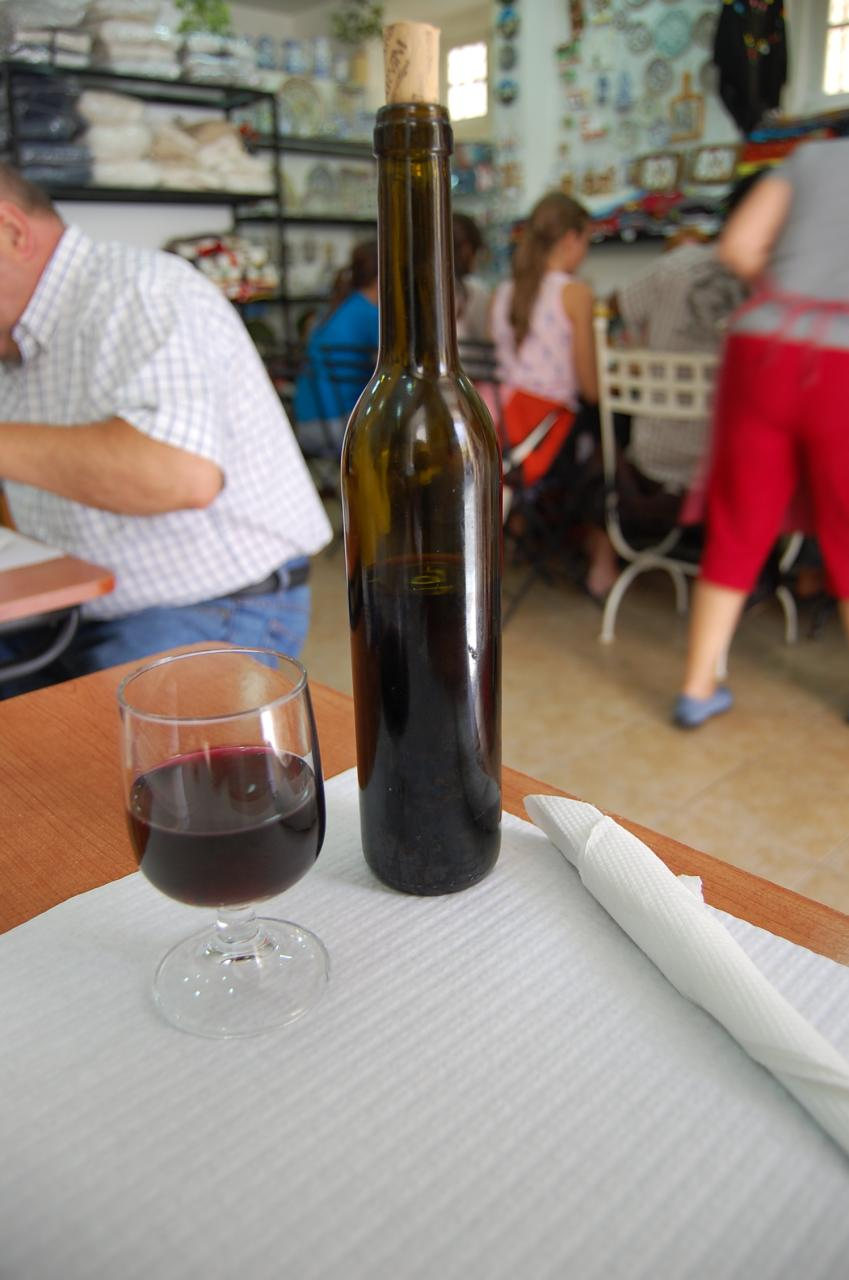
A bottle of the house red at a restaurant in Sintra, Portugal

House wine generally refers to an inexpensive drinking wine served in restaurants. Restaurant menus often omit detailed descriptions of a house wine's country of origin, winery or grape varietal, listing it simply as "house red" or "house white", depending on the wine's style. Some restaurants offer more specific categories of house wines, such as a "house chardonnay", or a "house merlot".

== Production and sale ==
House wines generally rotate, with restaurants typically transitioning from one kind to another based on availability or season. House wines are typically wines that a restaurant feels will appeal to a large proportion of its clientele, determined either by its past success as a normal entry on the wine list or because the wine is easy to drink and pairs well with a significant amount of menu items.

House wines are often bought in bulk by restaurants, enabling the restaurants to further lower their prices. While house wines are still usually offered by the glass, many restaurants also offer them by the carafe or bottle.

== Historical trends ==
Historically, house wine was usually poor quality, possibly "jug wine" derived from a second pressing of the grapes, and sold by the glass, promoted by a restaurant primarily on the basis of the wine's low cost. A 1979 article asserted that "so called 'fine' restaurants, those serving the haute cuisine or those considered posh or plush, will not carry a house wine". In the 21st century, due to a general rise in the availability of high quality wine, house wines have improved in quality in restaurants in the United States, and frequently may be produced by or for a specific restaurant, although house wines will still usually be on the cheaper end of the wine list for any given restaurant.

== See also ==
- Table wine
- Wine tasting
