= Slabtown, Portland, Oregon =

District in Portland, Oregon, U.S.

Slabtown is a district in Portland, Oregon's Northwest District neighborhood, in the United States.

Slabtown has been described as "roughly 12 city blocks riddled with residential and industrial-chic buildings, local eateries, airy coffee shops, craft distilleries and breweries, indie boutiques, theaters, and galleries", "nestled between Portland's two trendiest Northwest neighborhoods—the Pearl and Nob Hill". In 2019, Seattle Met said, "Slabtown is not only the newest arrival to the Northwest Portland scene, but it’s also arguably the most intriguing and makes for an ideal weekend getaway."
