= Christmas in Portland, Oregon =

Holiday celebrations in the United States

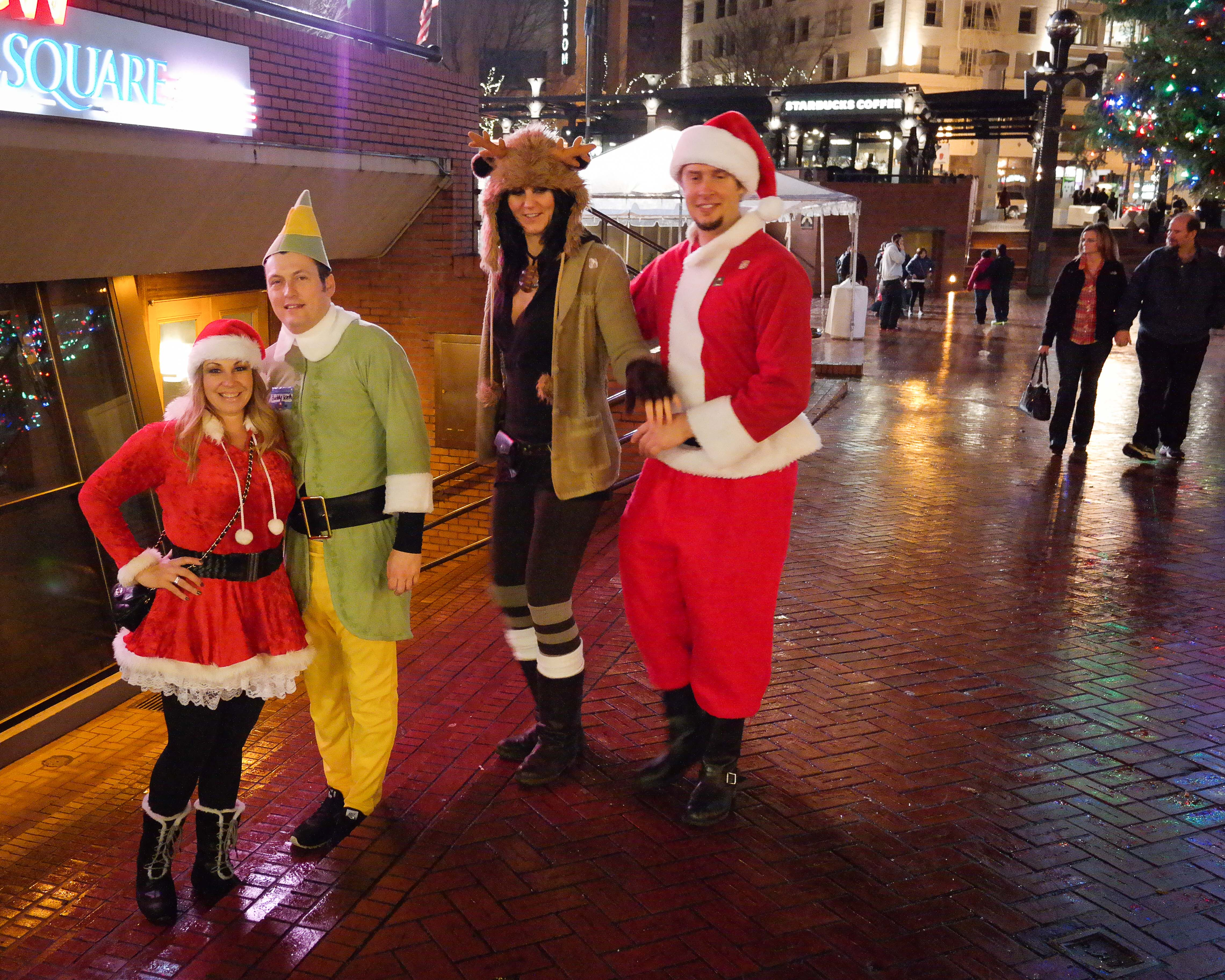
People in Christmas clothes at Pioneer Courthouse Square in 2013

There are many ways in which the Christian holiday of Christmas is celebrated in the American city of Portland, Oregon. Annual traditions include the Christmas Ships Parade, Peacock Lane, the Pioneer Courthouse Square Christmas tree, and the art installation Santa Clones. The city hosts many other displays, concerts, and other performances related to Christmas.

== Events and other traditions ==
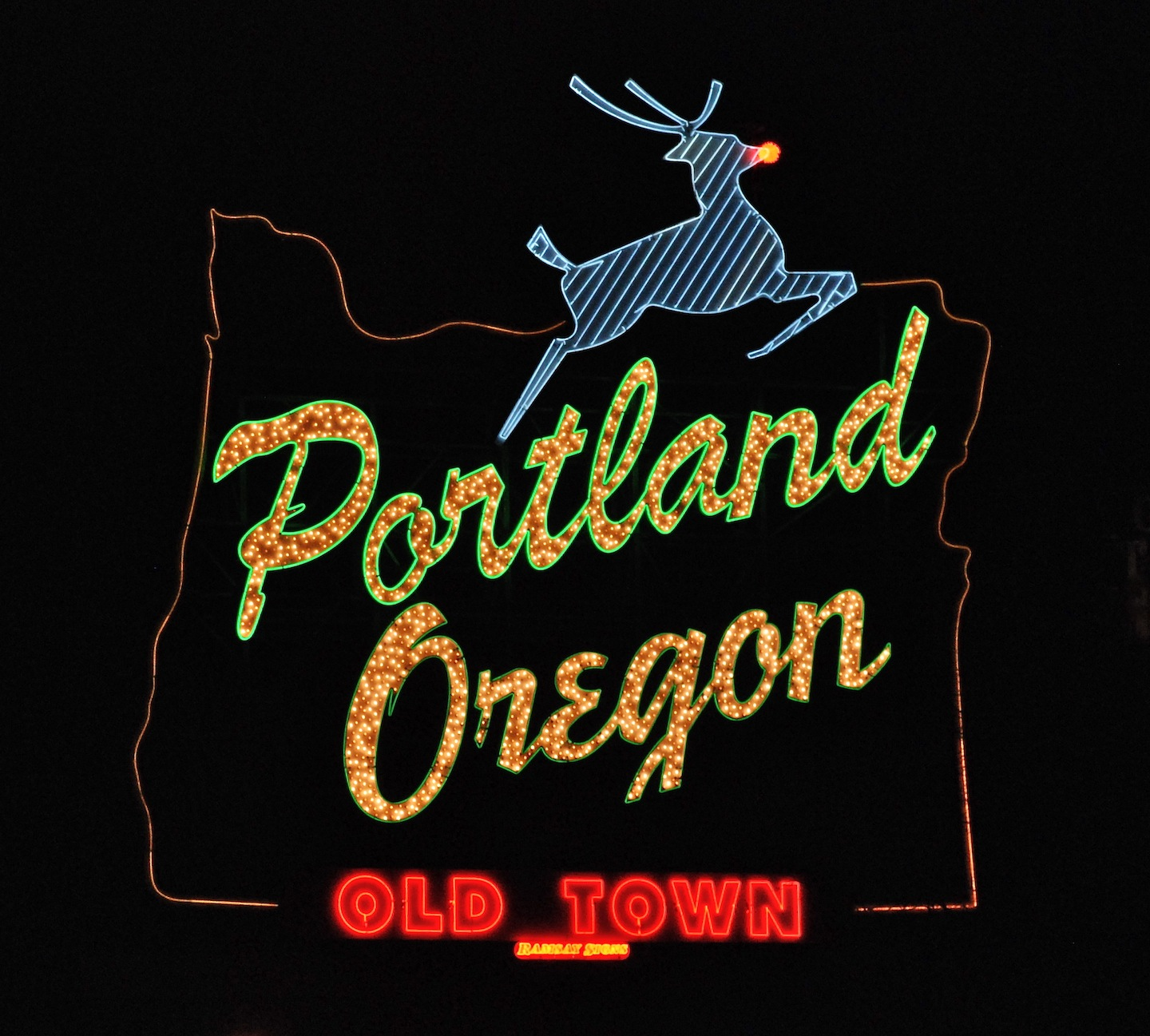
The White Stag Sign at night in 2010, with a neon-red nose in imitation of the character Rudolph the Red-Nosed Reindeer

The placing of a red nose on the White Stag sign as an imitation of Rudolph the Red-Nosed Reindeer has become known as "Nose Day" and, to many, signals the start of the Christmas season in Portland, according to The Oregonian. Historically, the Meier & Frank Holiday Parade (originally the Fairy Tale Parade and later Macy's Holiday Parade) signified the arrival of Santa Claus, prompting some Portlanders to refer to the event as "the Christmas parade". Annual events include the Christmas Ships Parade (established in 1954) and the lighting of the Pioneer Courthouse Square Christmas tree.

Starting in the 1920s, the Portland Police Bureau's Sunshine Division has delivered food to those in need around Christmas. The department has become a non-profit organization with a food pantry and organizes events such as "Shop with a Cop". The Portland Expo Center has hosted "America's Largest Christmas Bazaar" since 1982. Annual Christmas displays are hosted at the Benson Hotel and many other hotels, as well as Pittock Mansion. The lobby bar of Hotel Vintage, called Bacchus Bar, has hosted the Christmas-themed pop-up bar Miracle. Some churches in Portland have offered Blue Christmas services. In 2025, local faith leaders organized a Blue Christmas vigil outside the Portland ICE facility. Approximately 75 people gathered at Caruthers Park, then walked to the facility. The Winter Market has hosted a Christmas in July event at the Goat Blocks.

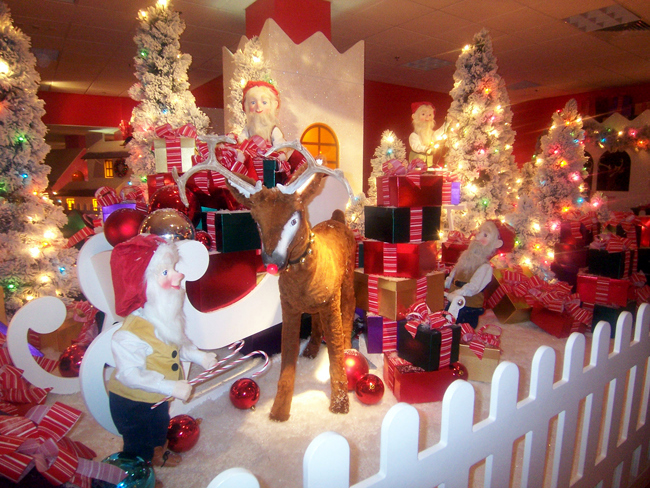
Santaland, Macy's, 2008

Starting in the 1950s and lasting for over forty years, Santaland was a feature of the Meier & Frank (later Macy's) store in downtown Portland's Meier & Frank Building. It took place on the sixth floor and later the tenth floor, and featured a monorail. Following the store's closure, some items from Santaland were donated to the Oregon Historical Society (OHS) and the Portland Business Alliance. These nostalgic items continue to be on display, and include animatronic elves, a mechanical Rudolph, a model of Santaland's original monorail, a Cinnamon Bear costume, and a chair used for Santa Claus greetings.

Nordic Northwest hosts the annual ScanFair, which has been described as a "Scandinavian-style Christmas marketplace", at the Oregon Convention Center with crafts, dancing, food, and live music. According to The Oregonian, the event "typically includes pickled herring and meatball eating contests, as well as traditional Scandinavian music and dance". Beer festivals have included Holiday Ale Fest and Holiday Brew Fest, both held at Pioneer Courthouse Square.

The annual Potluck in the Park Christmas Dinner has been held for three decades. The event sees approximately 100 volunteers provide a free holiday meal for 1,000 people. It has been held at the Portland Art Museum for a decade.

=== Cinnamon Bear ===
According to The Oregonian, "The Cinnamon Bear story, as told in [a] 1937 radio production, was broadcast on radio stations across the country, but it became a particular local tradition when Portland-based Lipman's department store adopted Cinnamon Bear as its Christmas mascot. Along with Santa Claus, children could meet the bear at Lipman's flagship store (which is today home to the Royal Sonesta hotel). The tradition continued after Lipman's was sold and became Frederick & Nelson in 1979... But Frederick & Nelson closed its downtown store in 1986, and the company’s last Oregon location, at Washington Square mall, closed in 1991. Though versions of Cinnamon Bear made a few community appearances in the early 1990s, he began to fade from Portlanders' collective Christmas memories." The Portland Spirit offers Cinnamon Bear-themed cruises.

=== Concerts and other performances ===
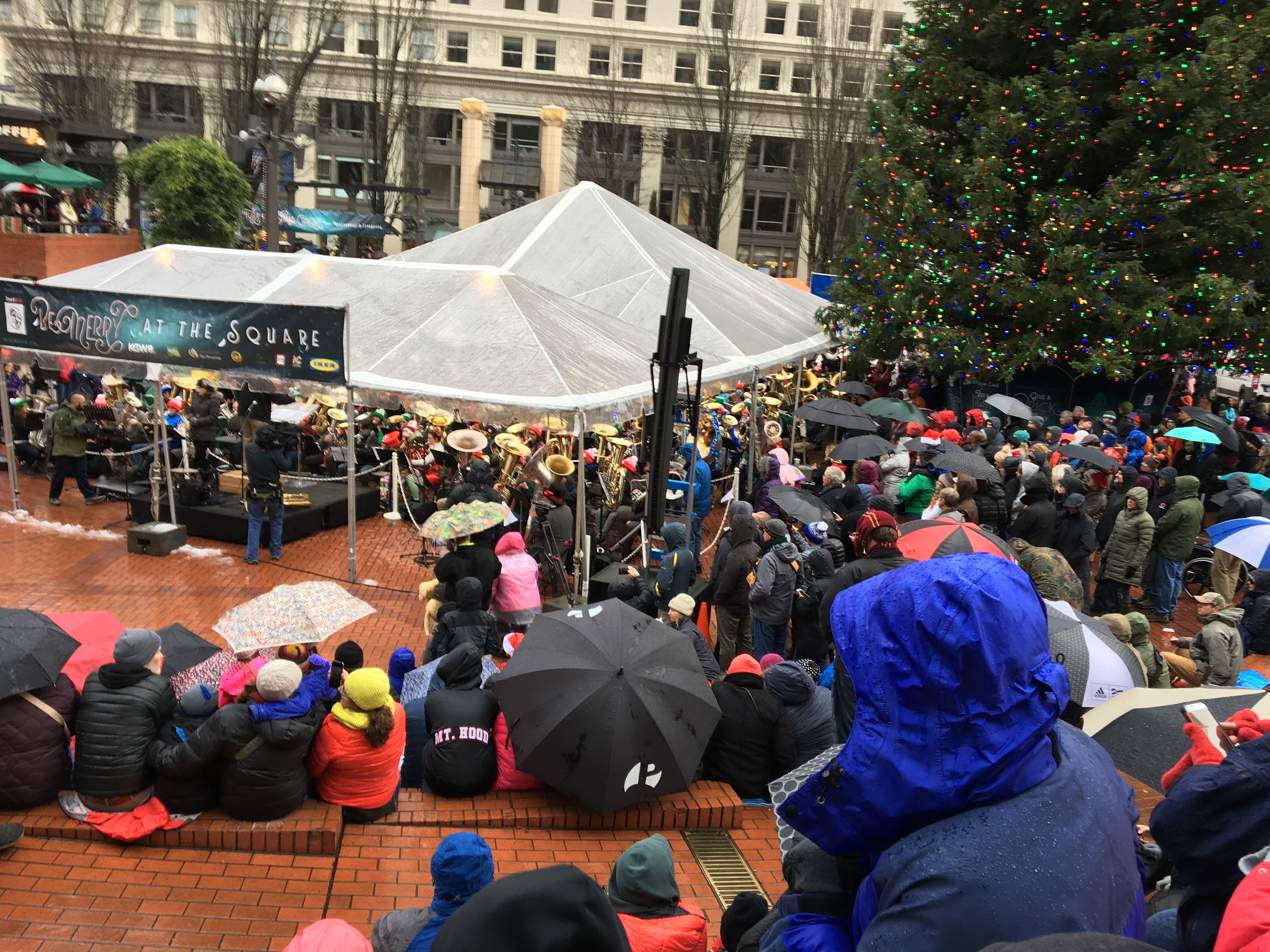
Tuba Christmas concert and the Pioneer Courthouse Square Christmas tree in 2016

Portland hosts many Christmas-related concerts and other performances, including the annual Tuba Christmas. The Oregon Symphony hosts Gospel Christmas at the Arlene Schnitzer Concert Hall each year. Portland's Singing Christmas Tree has been held for approximately sixty years. The annual Great Figgy Pudding Caroling Competition is held at Pioneer Courthouse Square. The Portland Baroque Orchestra performs Handel's Messiah annually.

The city has seen versions of Tchaikovsky's Christmas-centric ballet The Nutcracker (1892) presented by various arts organizations. Oregon Ballet Theatre performs George Balanchine's The Nutcracker (1954) annually.

=== Light displays ===
In addition to the Christmas Ships Parade and the Pioneer Courthouse Square Christmas tree, light displays are found at Peacock Lane in southeast Portland's Sunnyside neighborhood, at the Oregon Zoo in Washington Park for the ZooLights event, and at The Grotto in northeast Portland's Madison South neighborhood for the Festival of Lights. According to Portland Monthly, The Grotto's Christmas festival bills itself as "one of the world's largest Christmas choral festivals" and has indoor concerts with choirs representing many churches and schools.

Established in 1993, the annual Winter Wonderland event at the Portland International Raceway has been described as the "largest holiday light show west of the Mississippi" and the largest holiday light show in the Pacific Northwest. The 2024 event had 250 displays, some of which were animated. Winter Wonderland has raised funds for Sunshine Division.

=== Santa Claus and alternatives ===
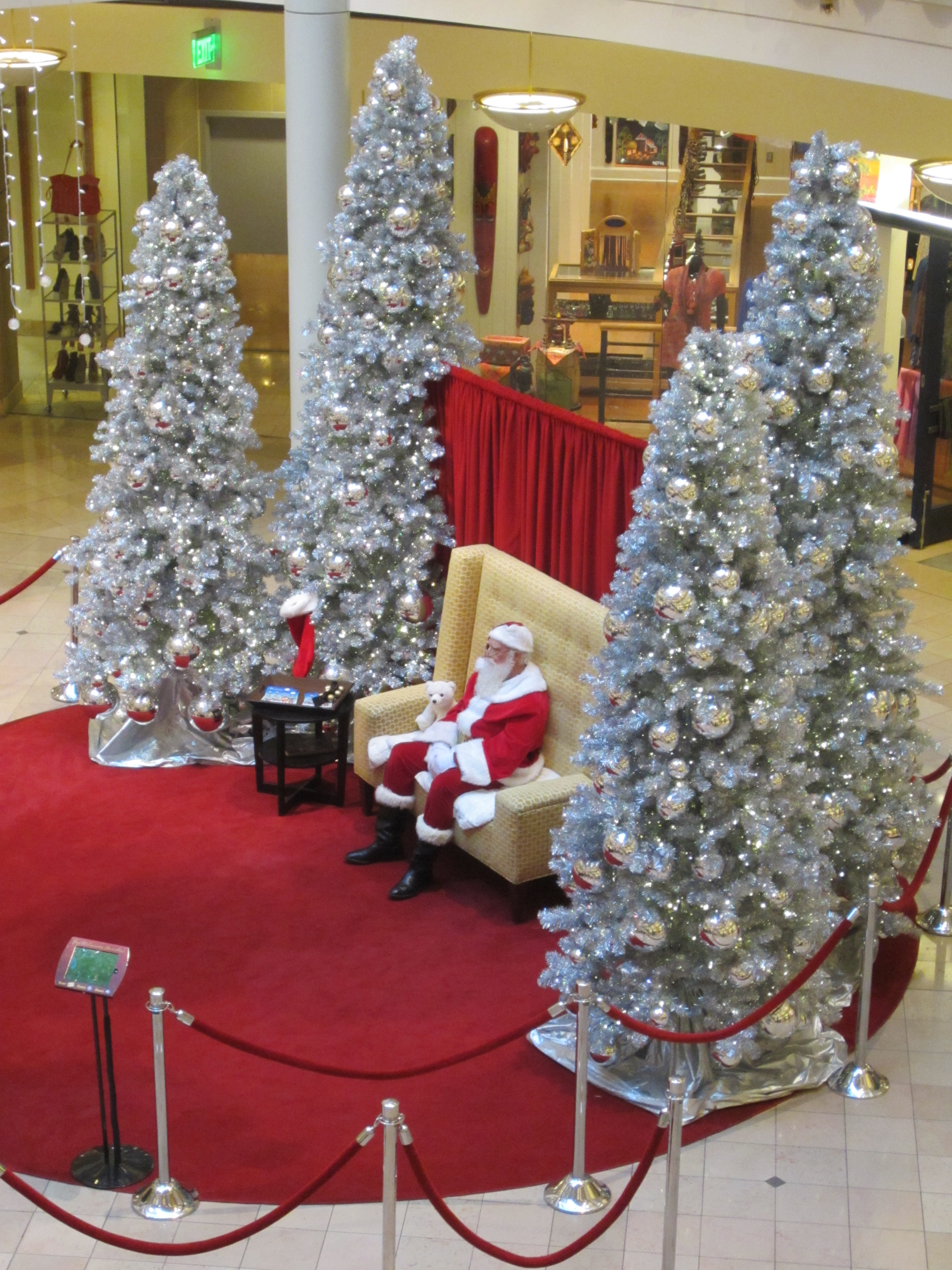
Santa Claus greeting at Pioneer Place in 2013

In addition to Santa greetings at Santaland, Portland has seen Black Santa and Hipster Santa greetings. Mayor Bud Clark dressed as Santa in 1991. Hipster Santa debuted at Pioneer Place in 2015. The Lloyd Center has hosted greetings with Santa, the Grinch, and Jack Skellington and Sally from the 1993 film The Nightmare Before Christmas. In 2025, Portland Fire & Rescue hosted "Safety Santa" at the Belmont Firehouse in southeast Portland.

The city has hosted an annual SantaCon pub crawl, sometimes called Stumptown Santacon. Since the early 2010s, Chris Willis has installed a display of Santa statues called Santa Clones throughout the city. A Santa-themed flash mob dance was held in downtown Portland in 2024.

Since 2010, the Krampus Lauf parade has been held on Hawthorne Boulevard in southeast Portland. Portland has also had Krampus greetings (as an alternative to Santa greetings) and Fear PDX has hosted a Krampus-themed haunted house in December. Approximately 150 people participated in the fifteenth annual parade in 2025.

In an effort to recognize both traditional Chinese and western holiday rituals, Lan Su Chinese Garden has hosted Asian Santa. According to The Oregonian, "While Asian Santa sports the typical outfit – red suit, black boots, big beard, glasses – he celebrates a slightly different holiday: Dongzhi, the Chinese winter solstice [...] Asian Santa is the representative of that cross-culture representation [...] arriving not in a sleigh but an ox cart."

== Christmas trees ==
Every year, a Christmas tree is installed in downtown Portland's Pioneer Courthouse Square. There is also a Christmas tree installation and lighting ceremony in St. Johns. A Christmas tree lot has operated in southeast Portland's Woodstock neighborhood since 2004. A local organization gives away Christmas trees to families in need each year.

== Media and business operations ==
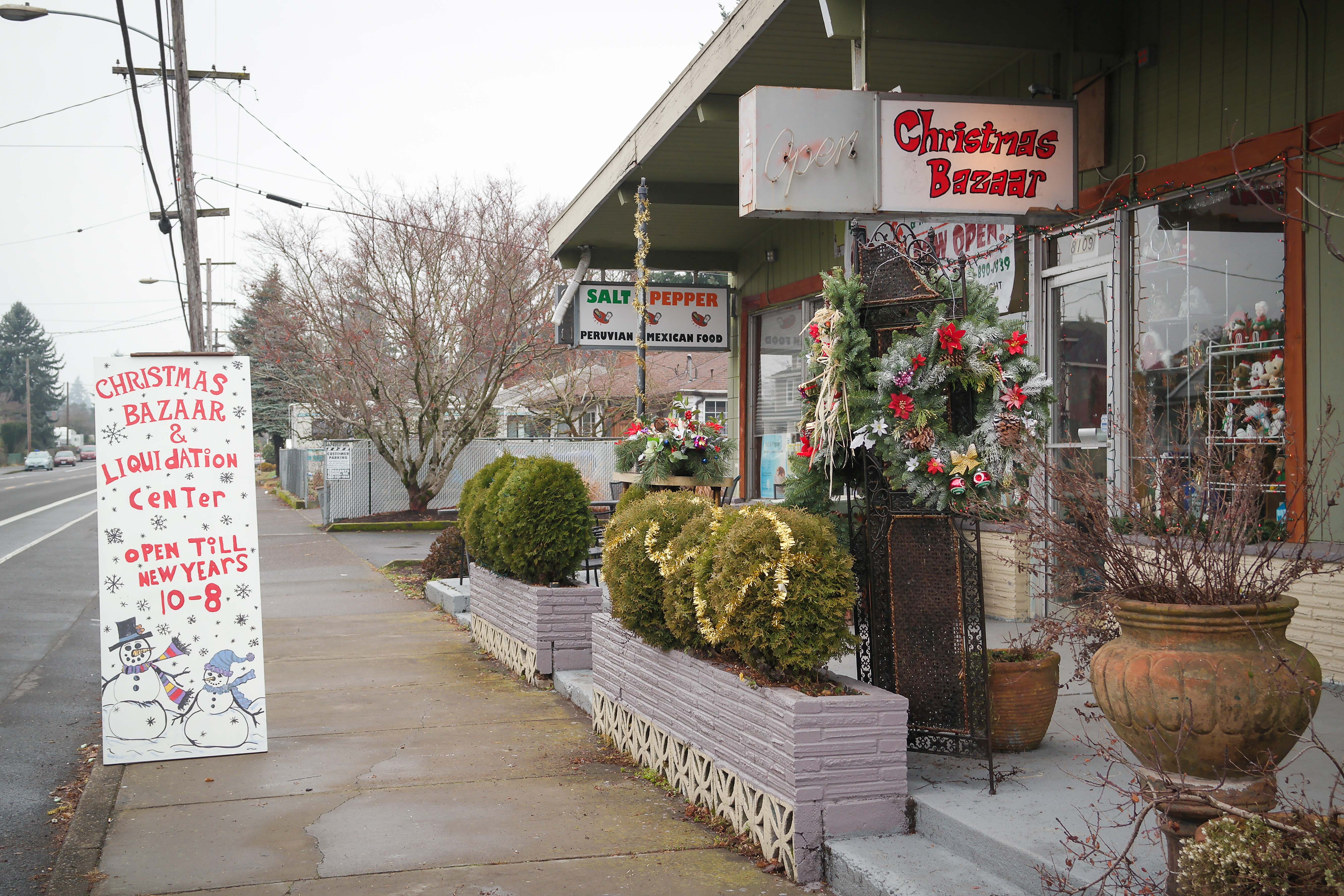
A Christmas bazaar in 2013

The radio stations KFIS and KKCW, which serve the Portland metropolitan area, play Christmas music. In 2024, KFIS started playing Christmas music on Election Day "as a way to provide a space of upliftment and positivity to combat the stress the Election Day brings", according to KGW. KGW has broadcast an hour-long special of the lighting ceremony for the Pioneer Courthouse Square Christmas tree, featuring a sing-along led by Pink Martini.

Many notable restaurants and other businesses have operated on Christmas, including East India Co. Grill and Bar, Excellent Cuisine, Doug Fir Lounge, Jake's Famous Crawfish, Jake's Grill, Laurelhurst Theater, Master Kong, The Original Dinerant, Portland City Grill, Radio Room, Shandong, Swiss Hibiscus, and Urban Farmer.

== See also ==
- Culture of Portland, Oregon
- Portland Winter Ice Rink
- Religion in Portland, Oregon
- Snow Day Village
