= International Tuba Euphonium Association =

International organisation dedicated to the tuba and the euphonium

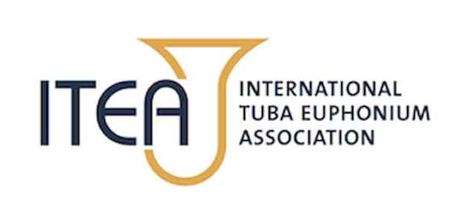
- ITEA logo
- Abbreviation: ITEA
- Formation: May 24, 1975; 51 years ago
- Founder: Robert Rÿker
- Type: INGO
- Legal status: 501(c) (3) NPO
- Purpose: maintain a liaison among those who take a significant interest in tuba and euphonium
- Location: Baltimore, Maryland, United States
- Region served: Worldwide
- Members: Open to all taking a significant interest in tuba or euphonium
- President: Øystein Baadsvik
- Website: http://www.iteaonline.org
- Formerly called: Tubists Universal Brotherhood Association

The International Tuba Euphonium Association (ITEA), founded in 1973 as the Tubists Universal Brotherhood Association (TUBA), is an international organization dedicated to performers, teachers and friends of the tuba and euphonium.

== The first association ==
The International Tuba Euphonium Association traces its roots to meetings of tuba students with their teacher, William Bell, who played with the NBC Symphony, at McSorley's Old Ale House, in Manhattan, to discuss the tuba and the art of performance on the same over food and drinks. These informal meetings happened on an irregular schedule during the 1930s. A humorously indecent name for this group was chosen by Bell―the “Royal Order of […]pots” [expletive deleted], for which the participants printed membership cards.

== T.U.B.A. ==
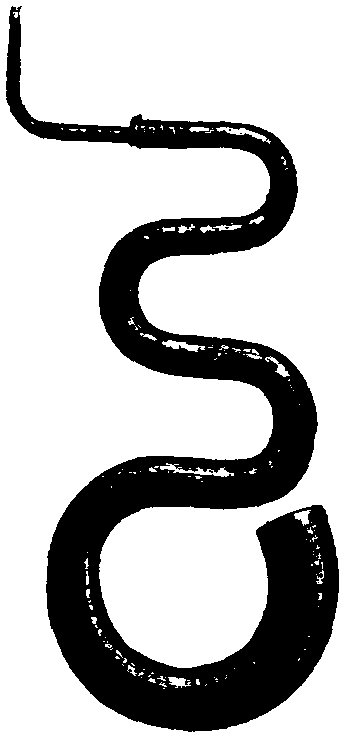
The ancient instrument the serpent was chosen as the first symbol of the association.

The Tubists Universal Brotherhood Association was started in the spirit of the tavern master classes between 1966 and 1971 by Robert Ryker, who played tuba with the Montreal Symphony Orchestra with the aid of J. Lesley Varner and Winston Morris. Ryker advertised seeking those interested in forming an organization for tuba players and quickly received support including funding from Conn and Miraphone. Three masters were first declared honorary members: Harvey Phillips (later innovator of Oktubafest and Tuba Christmas), Arnold Jacobs, and William Bell, from whom the inspiration had been drawn. The name T.U.B.A. was proposed by Ryker at the outset.

T.U.B.A. became an international movement following The First International Tuba Symposium-Workshop and the beginning of its newsletter, the T.U.B.A. Journal in 1973. A primary goal of the first symposium was to reach-out to composers and facilitate new works for the tuba. Harvey Phillips later estimated some 150 new works derived from that effort. The euphonium was added to the scope of the association with a national symposium title being edited to include "tuba-euphonium" in 1974. The constitution drafted in 1973 was revised and adopted in 1975.

In the final years that the association existed as T.U.B.A., it claimed 2500+ members from 50+ countries and had commissioned 27 new works for tuba or euphonium. The stated goals of the organization were and are :

- To expand performance and employment opportunities.
- To enhance the image and role of our instruments and performers.
- To explore pedagogical approaches through new teaching resources.
- To promote activity in new instrument design.
- To generate new compositions for the tuba and euphonium.
- To explore new directions in technique.
- To establish and maintain appropriate libraries of recorded and printed materials.
- To encourage tuba-euphonium workshops and conferences.
- To publish a journal.

== Ongoing organization ==
In 2000, T.U.B.A. changed its name to the International Tuba Euphonium Association (I.T.E.A.). The change was brought about to address concerns regarding the inclusion in its name of women and euphonium players, both of whom had long been members, in order to be more representative of the organization.

I.T.E.A. membership is open to all with a significant interest in the tuba and/or euphonium and requires annual dues. The association has an Executive Committee, a Board of Directors, an Honorary Advisory Board, and a Journal staff with area coordinators. It currently sponsors a biennial symposium, the International Tuba Euphonium Conference, as well as a journal, the ITEA Journal. When the international conference is not being held, regional conferences throughout the country are held instead.

== Past presidents ==
- H. Robert Rÿker (1973), Founder and International President
- Harvey G. Phillips (1973 North American Chapter President)
- Daniel Perantoni (1974 National President)
- R. Winston Morris (1975–1977)
- J. Lesley Varner (1977–1979)
- James Self (1979–1981)
- Brian Bowman (1981–1983)
- Harvey G. Phillips (1983–1987)
- Robert Daniel (1987–1989)
- Donald Little (1989–1991)
- Martin Erickson (1991–1993)
- Fritz Kaenzig (1993–1995)
- Jeffrey Funderburk (1995–1997)
- Samuel Pilafian (1997–1999)
- Scott Watson (1999–2001)
- Skip Gray (2001–2003)
- Mary Ann Craig (2003–2005)
- Dennis Askew (2005–2009)
- David Zerkel (2009–2011)
- Deanna Swoboda (2011–2013)
- Jerry Young (2013–2015)
- Marty Erickson (2015–2017)
- Kevin Wass (2017–2019)
- Gail Robertson (2019–2021)
- James Gourlay (2021–2023)
