= R. Winston Morris =

American tubist (born 1941)

Background information
- Born: Ralph Winston Morris; January 19, 1941 (age 85); Barnwell, South Carolina, U.S.
- Genres: Classical; jazz
- Occupations: Musician; professor
- Instruments: Tuba; euphonium
- Years active: 1967–2022
- Education: East Carolina University

Ralph Winston Morris (born January 19, 1941, in Barnwell, South Carolina) is an American tubist. He served as professor of tuba and euphonium at Tennessee Tech in Cookeville, Tennessee, for 55 years, and subsequent to his retirement after the 2021–2022 academic year, was named Professor Emeritus of Tuba and Euphonium. Morris is editor of The Tuba Source Book and the Euphonium Source Book.

== Biography ==
Morris earned his academic degree in music from East Carolina University in 1962. As the conductor of the Tennessee Tech Tuba Ensemble, he began promoting jazz tuba performance in an ensemble setting as early as 1967. Morris created the first tuba/euphonium ensemble at Tennessee Tech.

The Tennessee Tech Tuba Ensemble has performed under Morris's direction on Bourbon Street and at the New Orleans Jazz Festival, Disney World, the National MENC Conference in Kansas City, the International T.U.B.A. Conference in Austin, Texas, the Kennedy Center in Washington, D.C., and at the Spoleto Festival in Charleston, South Carolina. The ensemble has also performed in Carnegie Hall eight times, produced 31 commercial recordings—some which have been Grammy nominated—and generated more than 1,200 compositions for the tuba, euphonium, and tuba ensemble. Morris assembled the first euphonium choir and organized the first recording project for euphonium choir.

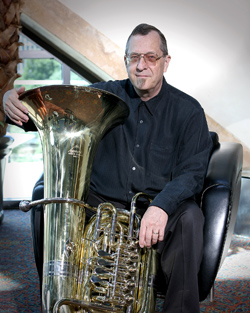
Morris with a Miraphone 188 5U tuba, c. 2008

Morris studied under William Bell, tuba player for the John Philip Sousa Band. Winston was also a member of the Matteson-Phillips Tubajazz Consort with Rich Matteson, Ashley Alexander, John Allred, Buddy Baker, Harvey Phillips and Daniel Perantoni.

Morris created and conducted Symphonia, a tuba/euphonium ensemble that was composed of top professional tuba and euphonium players from across the United States. A reunion concert billed as "Tubas of Mass Destruction" was held in 2007 at Tennessee Tech and included over 100 current and former students from his then–40 years of teaching. Throughout his teaching career, Morris has encouraged his students to arrange and compose pieces of music for the ensemble, which was necessary in the early days of the group, as there was virtually no repertoire for them to play.
