= Tuba Christmas (Portland, Oregon) =

Annual holiday concert in the United States

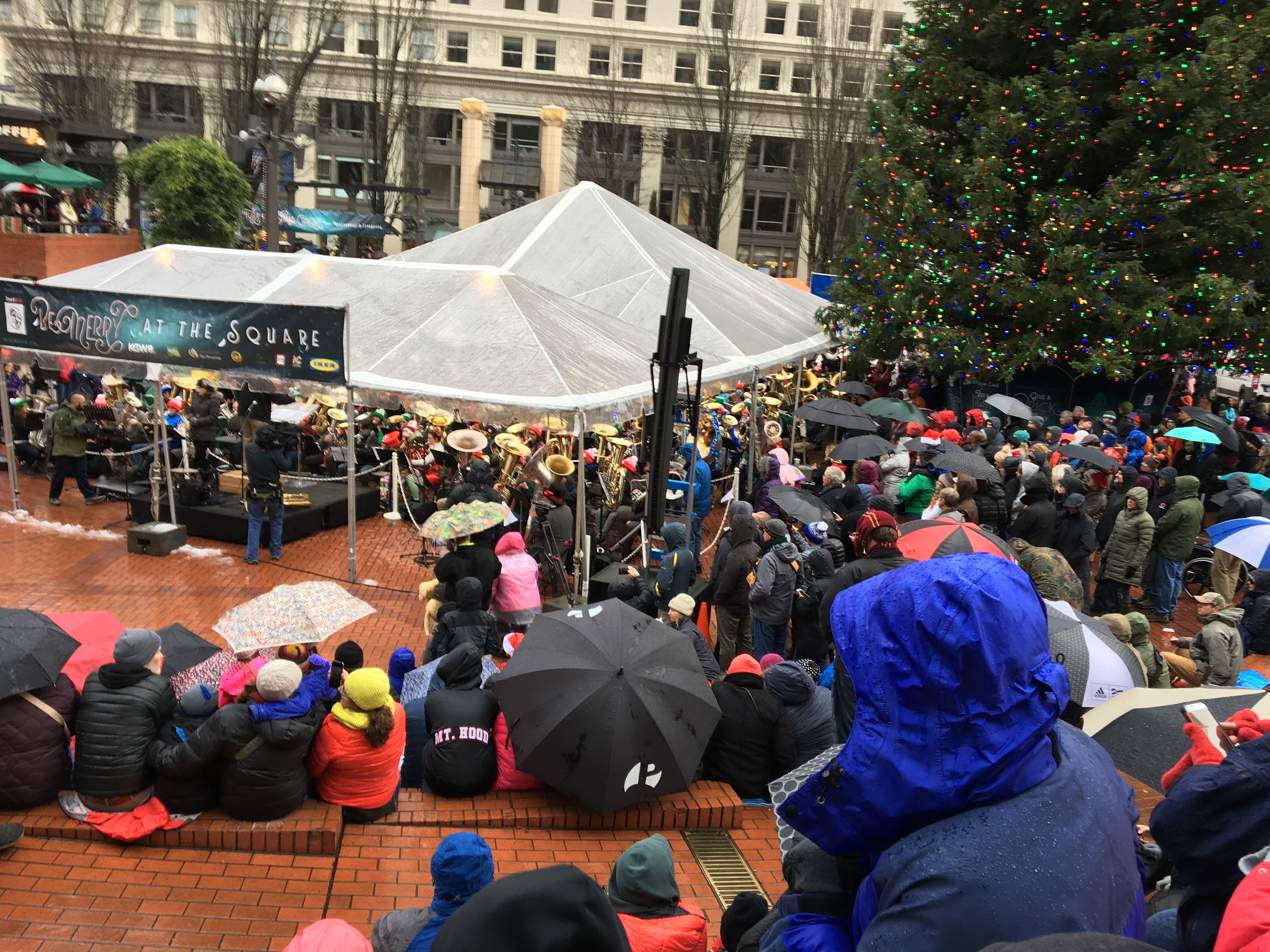
- The event in 2016
- Venue: Pioneer Courthouse Square
- Location: Portland, Oregon
- Country: United States

Tuba Christmas is an annual concert in Portland, Oregon, United States. The event features hundreds of volunteer tuba players performing Christmas carols and other holiday songs at Pioneer Courthouse Square in downtown Portland.

The concert has featured other instruments, including baritone horns, euphoniums, helicons, and sousaphones. There is also food and other activities. The Oregonian has said the concert "is always a crowd favorite". The newspaper's Douglas Perry has also called the event "a 'Keep Portland Weird' favorite".

== History ==
Similar Tuba Christmas concerts are held around the world (Tubachristmas); Portland's version is among the largest and was founded by John Keil Richards, who played the tuba for the Oregon Symphony. Following his death in 2011, former Sam Barlow High School band director Chuck Bolton became the conductor of the local Tuba Christmas.

The 2019 concert included students from Central Washington University, Oregon State University, and the University of Oregon, as well as singers from the Portland Opera. "Silent Night" was among songs performed. The 2020 event was canceled because of the COVID-19 pandemic. The 30th annual concert was held in 2021. Only 150 tuba performers were able to participate because of restrictions related to the pandemic.

There were approximately 150–200 players again in 2022. A tent was used to cover the players because of rain, which blocked the view for some attendees. There were approximately 350 tubas in 2024. The 2025 concert saw approximately 300 players perform for hundreds of people.

== See also ==
- Christmas in Portland, Oregon
- Culture of Portland, Oregon
