= Portland Winter Ice Rink =

Annual ice rink in Portland, Oregon, U.S.

- Constructed: Ice-America
- Area: 4,000–5,000 square feet
- Address: 499 Southwest Naito Parkway; Portland, Oregon, U.S.
- Location within Portland, Oregon
- Coordinates: 45.5184°N 122.6725°W
- Website: wintericerinkpdx.com

The Portland Winter Ice Rink is an ice rink, temporarily installed during winter months in Portland, Oregon, United States. Prosper Portland launched the project for the 2023–2024 season, and popular demand prompted the economic development organization to organize the rink again for the 2024–2025 season.

Budget limitations prevented Prosper Portland from installing the rink for the 2025–2026 season.

== Description ==
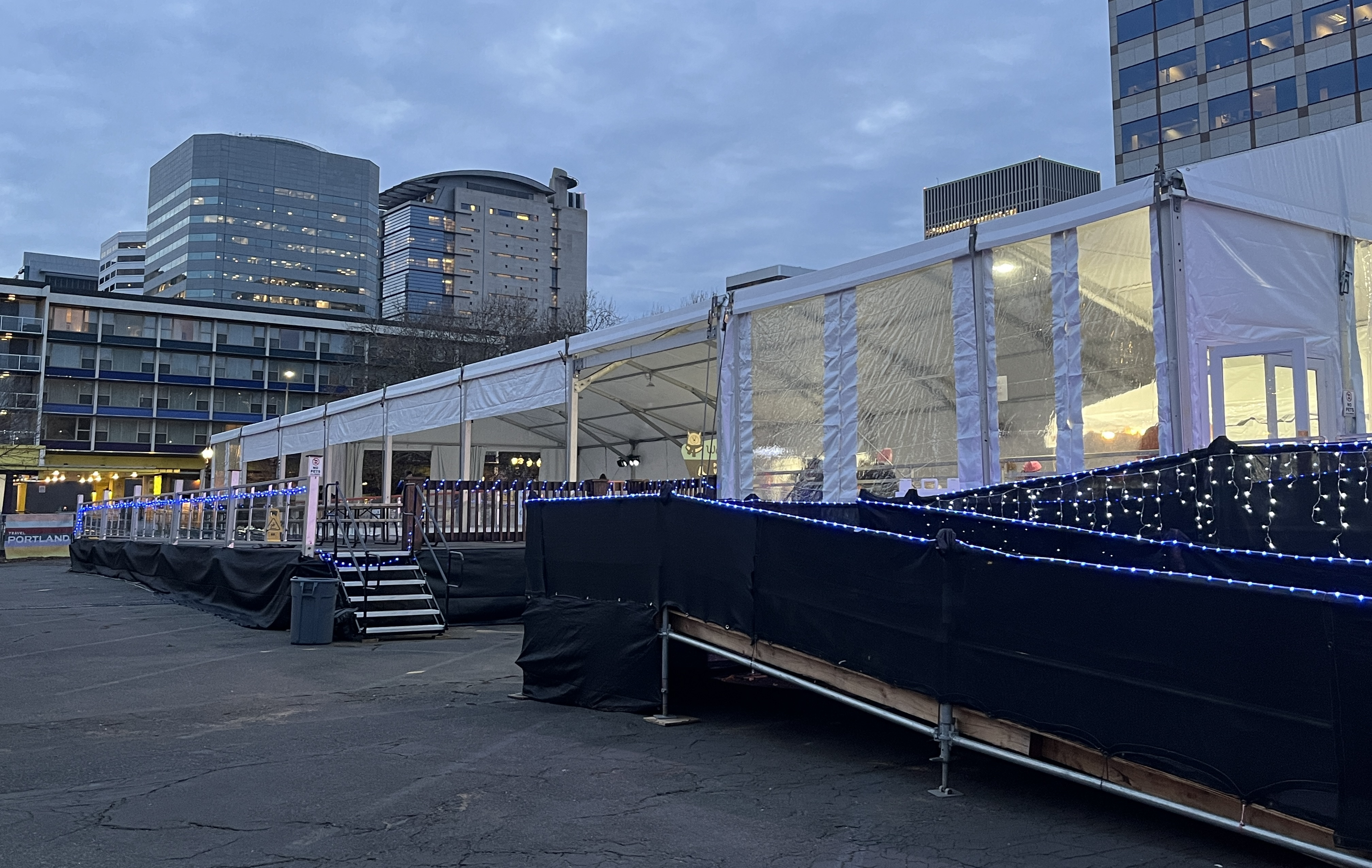
The ice rink in 2024

The covered ice rink is installed during winter months within the ramps at the western side of Portland's Morrison Bridge, near Southwest Naito Avenue between Morrison and Stark (also known as Harvey Milk) Streets. For the 2023–2024 winter season, the rink measured 80x50 feet and used approximately 600 gallons of water daily. The base was made from two-by-four lumber, plywood, and steel scaffolding, and the tent above the rink is made of white canvas and steel. The adjacent pop-up marketplace Woodsy Winter Village has Christmas trees, eateries, fire pits, games, seating areas, and shops. For the 2024–2025 winter season, the rink size was increased to 5,000 square feet and an observation deck was also added. Temporary workers are hired to help run the rink each year.

== History ==
=== 2023–2024 winter season ===
The Portland Winter Ice Rink was launched by the economic development organization Prosper Portland in 2023, and was originally slated to operate daily from December 16 to January 28, 2024 (except on Christmas). Proposed Portland partnered with Portland Parks & Recreation (PP&R) and event producer Vida en Color on the project, and hired Ice-America to build the rink, which occupies a space that previously served as a parking lot. Preparations took approximately two months. According to KOIN, the rink was the city's first for outdoor skating in 24 years. KATU said the Portland Winter Ice Rink was the city's first outdoor ice rink in more than 30 years, the previous one being at Pioneer Courthouse Square in 1989. The opening ceremony was attended by Mayor Ted Wheeler and featured speakers and the mascots of the Portland Pickles, Portland Trail Blazers, and the Portland Winterhawks.

Approximately 12,000 tickets for the rink were sold during December 16–31, generating close to $228,800. Due to its popularity, the rink was extended through February 11, 2024, operating at the same time as the Portland Winter Light Festival. The extension prompted a collaboration between the festival and organizers of the rink in the form of a light exhibit being added to the site. Wheeler and city council commissioner Carmen Rubio skated at the rink in January 2024, appearing on Oregon Public Broadcasting's program Weekend Edition. An estimated 18,000–20,000 people visited the rink during the 2023–2024 winter season, which cost approximately $450,000 to operate. The rink was unable to operate during January 11–19 because of ice and snow.

=== 2024–2025 winter season ===
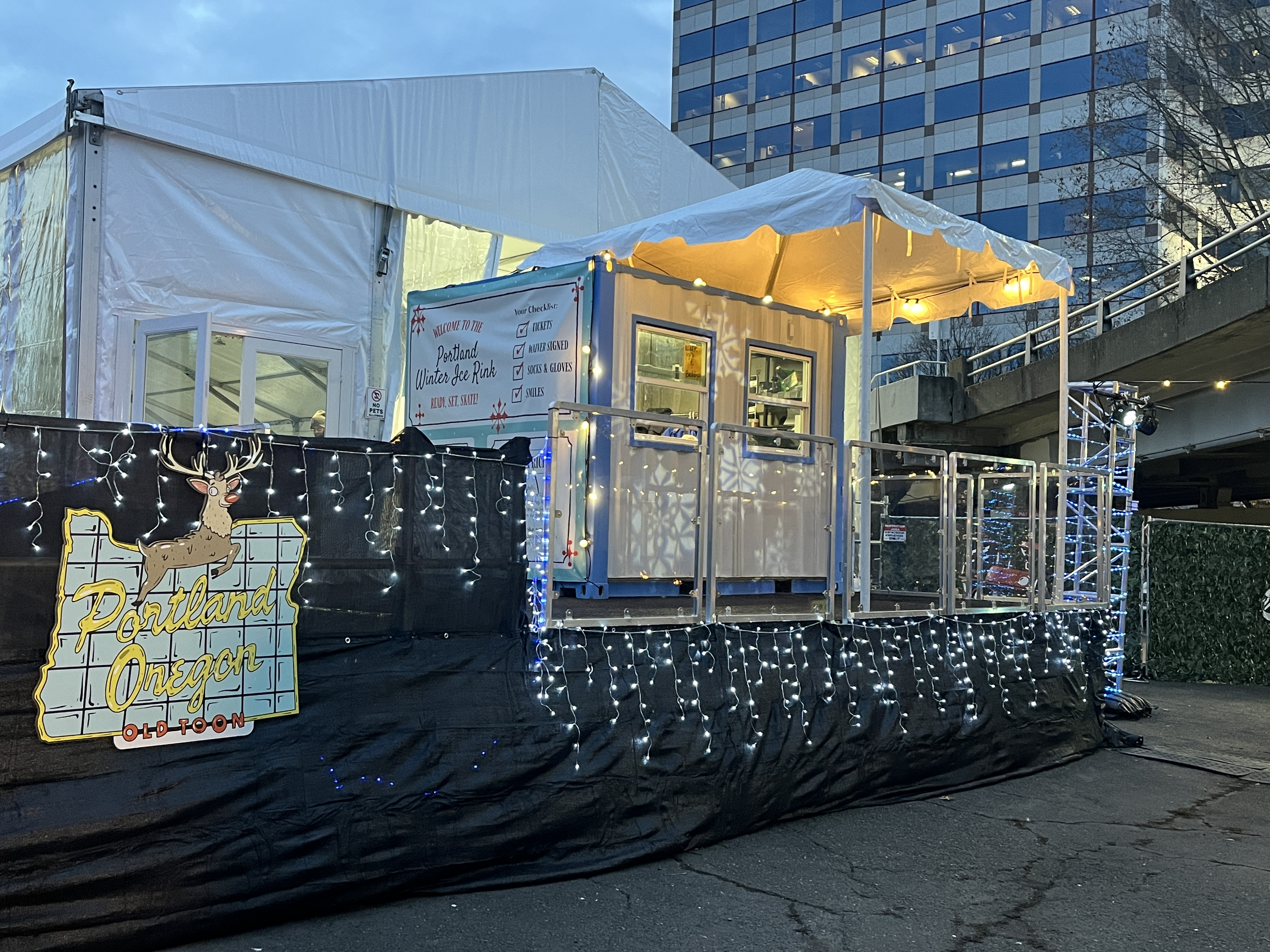
The entrance in 2024

In October 2024, Prosper Portland announced plans to install the rink at the same location from November 16 to January 5, 2025. Construction of the rink occurred during November 4–15. Prosper Portland partnered with Vida en Color again, and Ice-America hired between 25 and 35 people to build and maintain the rink. The city-funded project was operated by PP&R.

== Reception ==
In Portland Monthly's 2023 overview of ice skating options in the Portland metropolitan area, Margaret Seiler wrote, "We're impressed by the glam bathroom trailer, heat lamps, and board-game-stacked picnic tables tucked under the Morrison Bridge next to the tented rink, where the smells of hot chocolate and rotating food trucks like Tamale Boy are a big improvement over the stench of urine we noticed walking past the site before the rink opened." Seiler also opined:

... as is often the case at pop-up rinks, the size poses a problem. On our Christmas Eve visit it was too crowded to do a proper skating stride—wiggling, sculling, and baby stumbles are all there's really room for. The rink is so cramped that beginners are never far from the rail, but they might have an easier time learning on smoother ice, as the surface here is pretty rough. Unlike at regular rinks, skaters here have to sign a waiver and actively decline head protection—a hint that the free helmets at the skate counter might be worth borrowing.

== See also ==
- Christmas in Portland, Oregon
- Culture of Portland, Oregon
