= Peacock Lane =

Street in Portland, Oregon, U.S.

- Peacock Lane Historic District
- U.S. National Register of Historic Places
- U.S. Historic district
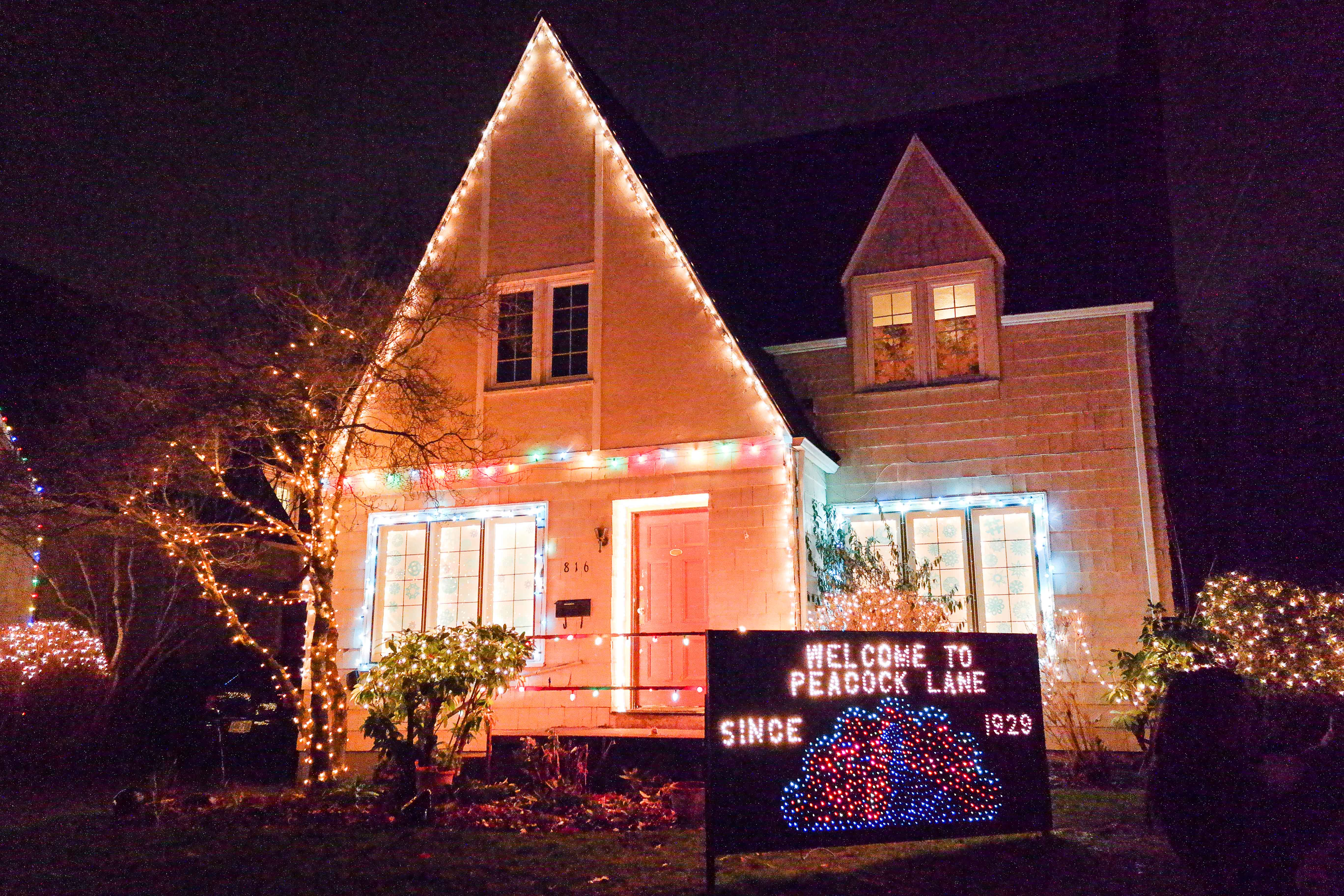
- House on the street, decorated for the holiday season

- Location within Portland, Oregon Location within Oregon Location within the United States
- Location: Portland, Oregon, roughly along SE Peacock Lane between SE Stark and Belmont Streets
- Coordinates: 45°31′05″N 122°37′18″W
- Area: 5 acres (2.0 ha)
- Built: 1923–1930
- Built by: Richard F. Wassell
- Architect: Richard F. Wassell
- Architectural style: Primarily English Cottage and Tudor Revival; some Colonial Revival and Spanish Revival
- MPS: Historic Residential Suburbs in the United States, 1830-1960 MPS
- NRHP reference No.: 100001774
- Added to NRHP: October 30, 2017

Peacock Lane is a four-block street in southeast Portland, Oregon, in the United States. It is known for its elaborately decorated homes during the Christmas and holiday season. During this time of year, thousands of people come to view the displays, enjoy hot cocoa, and previously take horsedrawn carriage rides, and sing Christmas carols. The street earned a listing on the National Register of Historic Places in 2017.

== History ==
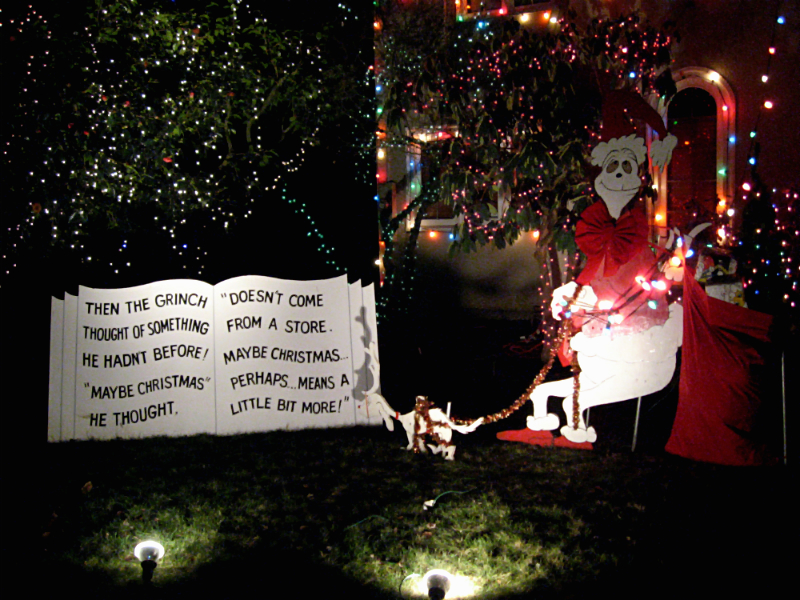
The "Peacock Lane Grinch"

The tradition of decorating the houses dates back to the 1920s. Since beginning, the event has occurred annually, except for a short interruption during World War II while the United States was rationing valuable resources, including electricity. Additionally, the lane went dark in 2020 due to the COVID-19 pandemic.

Many homeowners voluntarily pass along their decorations to new residents when they sell their properties. No homeowner is obligated to put up any lights or displays.

Popular annual displays include several Peanuts characters ice skating on a small pond, a plywood Oregon State Beaver, and a large wooden Grinch from How the Grinch Stole Christmas! that has been a staple since the 1980s. The Grinch has been vandalized several times over the years. It was stolen for a brief period in 1994 and was decapitated in 1997. The Grinch now has a red bow tied around his neck to help conceal the damages. More recent displays feature characters from Doctor Who, The Muppets, The Nightmare Before Christmas, Star Wars, and several Nickelodeon cartoon shows. A life-sized mural of Will Ferrell's "Buddy" from the 2003 film Elf adorns a small stand that gives out hot chocolate and coffee.

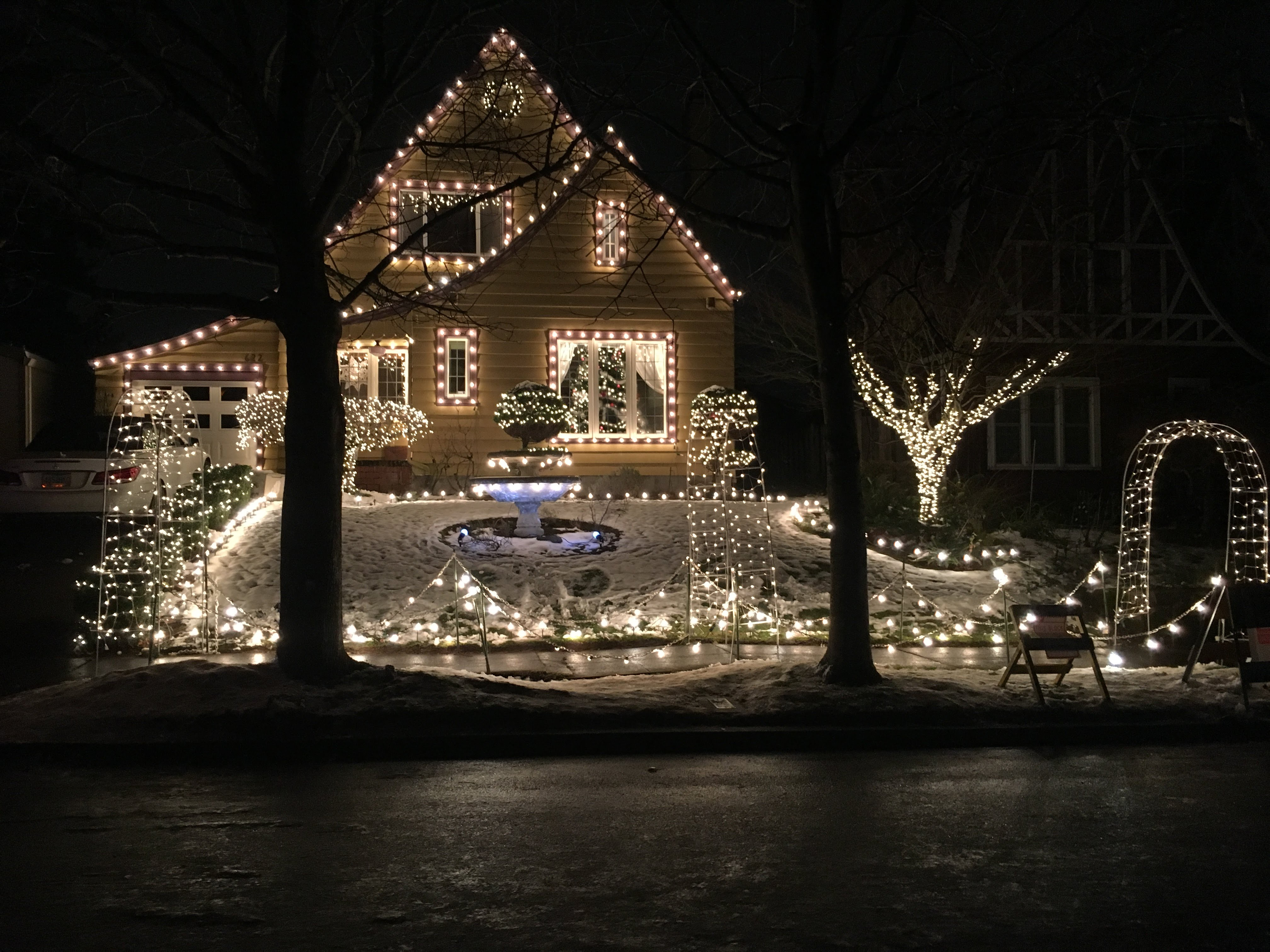
Lights on a Tudor revival-style house on as snowy night on Peacock Lane

As the annual tradition became increasingly popular, residents on the lane have cited their concerns over vandalism, pollution, litter, heavy traffic, and public urination. As a result, the street is now closed to automobiles on certain evenings. The Portland Police department has also stepped up patrols and employs officers to direct traffic during busier hours.

In June 2017, after a developer purchased one of the homes and began building on the lot, the area was nominated for listing on the National Register of Historic Places and earned the designation later that November. Residents were worried that the developer would not build in the traditional English Cottage and Tudor Revival styles of the street. The street contains 27 historic buildings and six buildings that are not considered historic.

== See also ==
- 37th Street (Austin)
- Christmas in Portland, Oregon
- Culture of Portland, Oregon
- National Register of Historic Places listings in Southeast Portland, Oregon
