= William John Bell =

American tuba player (1902–1971)

Bell with his tuba

William John Bell (born December 25, 1902, Creston, Iowa, died August 7, 1971, Perry, Iowa) was the premier player and teacher of the tuba in America during the first half of the 20th century. In 1921, he joined the band of John Philip Sousa, and from 1924 to 1937 he served as principal tuba with the Cincinnati Symphony Orchestra. In 1937 General Electric's David Sarnoff invited conductor Arturo Toscanini to select personnel for The NBC Symphony Orchestra. William Bell was the third musician selected by Toscanini, after his concertmaster Mischa Mischakoff and principal oboe Philip Ghignatti.

In 1943, he became principal tubist for the New York Philharmonic. Leopold Stokowski invited Bell to perform and narrate George Kleinsinger's "Tubby the Tuba", and to perform and sing a special arrangement of 'When Yuba Plays The Rhumba on the Tuba'. In 1955, Bell performed the American premiere of Ralph Vaughan Williams' Concerto for Bass Tuba and Orchestra. He was professor of tuba at the Manhattan School of Music until 1961, and Indiana University from 1961 to 1971. Bell's students included the late Harvey Phillips, the late Edward Herman, Jr., the late Joseph Novotny, the late Abe Torchinsky, the late Ed Livingston, the late Dennis F. Parker, Don Harry, Fred Marzan, Dick Babcock, Paul Krzywicki, and R. Winston Morris. As Bell died in 1971, low brass lineage practitioners on the Bell method have become more rare.

== Recordings ==
The Golden Crest LP album and 45 RPM Single 'Bill Bell and His Tuba' were released by Golden Crest Records in 1957. Bell appeared on two album covers with his tuba, one in color. A CD version of the album had limited release in 2008.

== Tubachristmas ==
Beginning in 1974, under the auspices of the Harvey Phillips Foundation, thousands of tubists and euphoniumists worldwide join together each December at local Tubachristmas events in honor of not only the holiday season, but of the life and teaching of Bill Bell. An arrangement of the Bach chorale 'Komm, süßer Tod' (also called 'Come Sweet Death)', Bell's favorite chorale, is sometimes played at Tubachristmas events.

== Memorial concerts ==
Every first Saturday in November, a number of tuba and euphonium players gather in Perry, Iowa, the location of Mr. Bell's grave and the town where he died. The musicians perform a free public concert of pieces arranged for four-part low brass in Mr. Bell's memory as a part of a fine arts series in Perry. Then the players gather at the gravesite and play 'Come Sweet Death' and 'Dona Nobis Pacem' in his memory.

== William J. Bell Tribute Ensemble ==
At the David L. Walters Division of Music at Jacksonville State University in Alabama, Bell's memory and legacy is commemorated by the William J. Bell Memorial Quartet, an active tuba/euphonium student ensemble.
