= Delta Park =

Park complex in Portland, Oregon, U.S.

East Delta Park
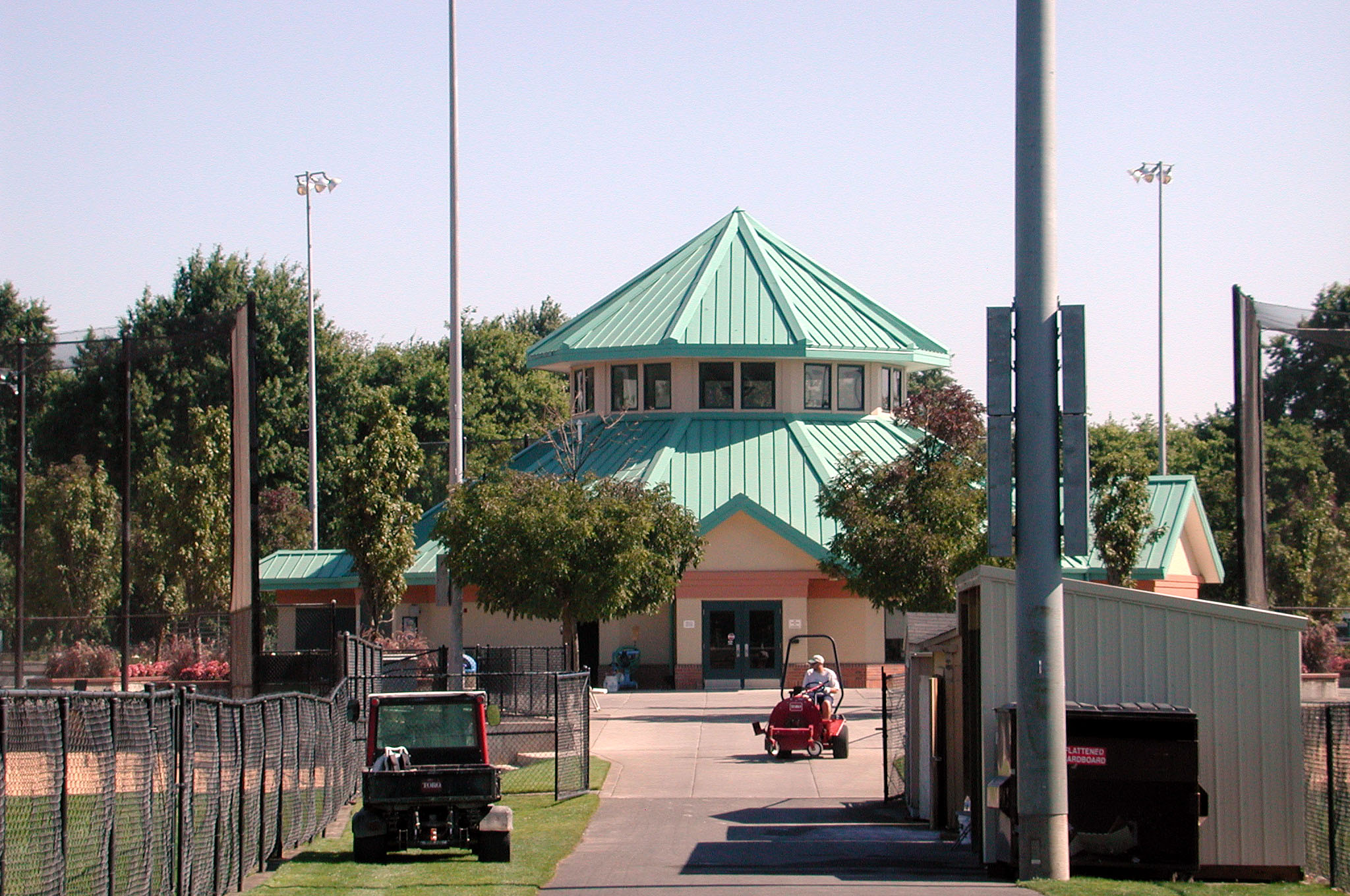
- Owens Sports Complex in East Delta Park, 2008
- Interactive map of East Delta Park
- Type: Urban park
- Location: N Denver Ave. and Martin Luther King Jr. Blvd. Portland, Oregon
- Coordinates: 45.599°N 122.680°W
- Area: 87.47 acres (35.40 ha)
- Created: 1950
- Operator: Portland Parks & Recreation
- Open: 6 a.m. to 10 p.m. daily
- Public transit: Delta Park/Vanport; 6

Delta Park is a public municipal park complex in north Portland in the U.S. state of Oregon. Delta Park is composed of two distinct sections referred to as East and West Delta Park. The Owens Sports Complex is a notable attraction of East Delta Park, bringing teams from across the West Coast to compete in an array of sports.

== Description ==
Delta Park straddles Interstate 5, between the Columbia Slough to the south and the Columbia River to the north. The section east of the Interstate is known as East Delta Park, and to the west is West Delta Park. The latter area was formerly known as the city of Vanport, created during World War II to house shipbuilders and was destroyed by a flood in 1948. Henry Kaiser built the World War II city of Vanport adjacent to Delta Park, helping house thousands who worked the shipyards. At its peak, the then second-largest city in the state included schools, libraries, and a theater. After the flood in 1948, part of the area was transformed into Delta Park in the 1950s.

=== East Delta Park ===
The Owens Sports Complex, a large part of East Delta Park, includes seven softball fields, nine soccer fields, a number of beach volleyball courts, and a concessions building. The complex is named for William V. Owens, a former park superintendent who developed and managed the city's softball program. East Delta Park also has a dog off-leash area, a football field, paved paths, picnic tables, a playground, and a volleyball court. The Portland Parks & Recreation Department operates the 85.34-acre (34.54 ha) park, which is open from 6 a.m. to 10 p.m.

The Urban Forestry Division of the Portland Parks Department maintains a street-tree arboretum in East Delta Park. The trees are the varieties the division recommends for planting in public rights-of-way between curbs and sidewalks. Headquartered in the park, the division uses the arboretum to teach tree identification to members of Friends of Trees and similar community organizations.

=== West Delta Park ===
Portland International Raceway, for car, motorcycle and bicycle racing, is part of West Delta Park. Sharing the park with the raceway are the Heron Lakes Golf Course, a dog off-leash area, and natural areas. Force Lake at 45°36′17″N 122°41′37″W in the northwest corner of the golf course attracts many species of birds. Signs around the lake describe the wildlife and explain the history of Vanport.

== History ==
=== Homelessness crisis ===
The homeless epidemic facing Portland has increased in previous years, particularly after the spread of COVID-19. Following the George Floyd protests in the summer of 2020, Portland had cut $26.9 million dollars from the police force's budget. Furthermore, the Portland Police Bureau had specified responding to high-priority calls because of the declined budget. Officer positions aligned with fighting narcotics and organizing neighborhood safety were eliminated. Less attention was given to the homelessness crisis in Portland and unhoused areas like East Delta Park began to sprawl. As of May 2021, Portland had put a pause on routine sweeps of homeless camps. North Union Court separates the Owens Sports Complex of East Delta Park and the encroaching encampments. Increasing illegal site access has intruded onto North Union Court and employees in the area were disabled from working on the area due to the obstructions of the encampments.

News organizations have interviewed people living in the encampments, and it has been reported that many of the inhabitants have been parked in their recreational vehicles (RVs) for years. The people living in RVs around East Delta Park have developed into a community, one with leaders and rules. Some residents of this area, which is across the street from the Owens Sports Complex, have described what those guidelines are. There are tidiness guidelines in part to keep the community in line with city code.

=== Proud Boys rally ===
On September 26, 2020, inside of the Owens Sports Complex of East Delta Park, the grass soccer fields were the location of a Proud Boys rally of over 300 people. It was expected that there would be over 1,000 members in attendance. Governor Kate Brown sent state troopers in anticipation of the Proud Boys and counter-protests. The group present at the Owens Sports Complex could be identified as MOSD, or the "Ministry of Self Defense", a western group organized by Enrique Tarrio. Enrique Tarrio, a national figure and leader of the Proud Boys, organized the event. He and other Proud Boys activists were charged later that year for plotting the Capital storming of January 6, 2021. The Proud Boys rally of the Owens Sports Complex sparked a separate counter protest that gathered near Delta Park at the Vanport site in North Portland. After around 90 minutes at the Owens Sports Complex, the rally group of 300 began to disperse. The city of Portland and their Parks & Recreation team did not grant the Proud Boys a permit.

=== Portland Urban Forestry Headquarters ===
East Delta Park and has also been subjected to theft and vandalism. Outside of the Owens Sports Complex of East Delta Park, but still inside East Delta Park, is the Portland Urban Forestry Headquarters. Preceding 2022, the headquarters had been broken into, and more than a dozen incidents of vandalism have been recorded since the summer of 2021. A vehicle had been stolen for a short amount of time and subsequently it now costs the city $261,000 annually to have someone guard the site.

=== Delta Park Center ===
The Delta Park shopping center is located alongside the Owens Sports Complex of East Delta Park. The shopping center is separated from the fields by a tree line and parking lot. Homeplace Furniture and Design is located within it. Personal accounts from the manager of the store describe an increase in garbage, cars, camps, and structures piling up since the start of the pandemic. On May 29, 2021, private security guard Logan Gimbal was involved in a fatal shooting in the parking lot at the Delta Park Center shopping plaza. Logan Gimbal faced charges, and was subsequently convicted, and sentenced to life in prison with a possibility of parole.

== See also ==
- Delta Park Powwow
- Winter Wonderland (Portland, Oregon)
