= Delta Park Powwow =

Annual event in Portland, Oregon, U.S.

- Frequency: Annually
- Venue: Delta Park
- Location: Portland, Oregon
- Country: United States
- Inaugurated: 1970
- Attendance: 15,000 (2024)
- Organiser: Bow and Arrow Culture Club

The Delta Park Powwow is an annual event in Portland, Oregon, United States. Established in 1970, the multi-day event has been organized by the nonprofit organization Bow and Arrow Culture Club since 1986. The event celebrates Native American culture and takes places at Delta Park. The event features art, cultural exhibitions, food, jewelry, and various vendors. There is also competitive and intertribal dancing.

The event's first Two-spirit special was held in 2010. Hundreds of people attended the 50th event in 2023, which was the first since 2019 because of the COVID-19 pandemic. In 2023, Pride Northwest moved annual Pride festivities to July in part to avoid schedule conflicts with the Delta Park Powwow, Father's Day, and Juneteenth celebrations. Approximately 15,000 people attended the Delta Park Powwow in 2024.

== See also ==
- Culture of Portland, Oregon
- Indigenous peoples of the Pacific Northwest Coast
- Native American peoples of Oregon
