= Winter Wonderland (Portland, Oregon) =

Annual holiday attraction in Portland, Oregon, U.S.

- Logo
- Status: Active
- Frequency: Annually
- Venue: Portland International Raceway, Delta Park
- Location: Portland, Oregon
- Country: United States
- Years active: 32–33
- Organiser: Sunshine Division
- Website: winterwonderlandportland.com

Winter Wonderland (sometimes referred to as the Safeway Winter Wonderland) is an annual holiday attraction and light display in Portland, Oregon, United States. Established in 1993, the event was later purchased by the Sunshine Division, which continues to host the attraction as a fundraiser. Winter Wonderland is held at the Portland International Raceway and features millions of lights displayed for guests, most of whom view installations from their vehicles.

There are approximately 250 light displays. Winter Wonderland is among the largest light displays in the Pacific Northwest and bills itself as the largest west of the Mississippi River. Over 2 million people have seen the attraction since its inception.

== Description ==
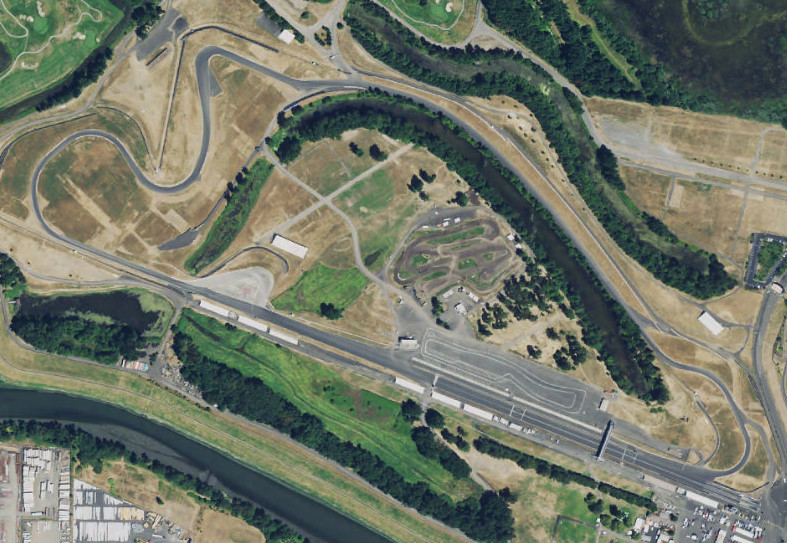
Winter Wonderland is held at Portland International Raceway (satellite image shown).

Winter Wonderland is a drive-through holiday light show, installed annually at Portland International Raceway, in North Portland's Delta Park. It bills itself as "the largest light holiday show west of the Mississippi" and has approximately 250 light displays, some of which depict Christmas carols. Some of the displays are animated. The event serves as a fundraiser for the Sunshine Division, with all proceeds benefiting the organization.

Most guests experience the attraction from their vehicles, except on select nights reserved for bicyclists or pedestrians. The 2-mile-long drive lasts approximately 30 minutes. Winter Wonderland has had food trucks, a Starbucks mobile coffee truck, and beer and cider tastings.

One installation has a prancing reindeer. There are also Candy Cane Lane- and Toyland-themed displays. The Twelve Days of Christmas are represented by a series of displays for each day.

== History ==
The event was established in 1993. By 2010, Winter Wonderland attracted 100,000 guests annually and had collected approximately 33 tons of food and $480,000 for local charities, including the Salvation Army and the Sunshine Division. Comcast and Jubitz Corporation have sponsored the event. With funds from Murdock Trust, the Sunshine Division purchased the event, which now serves as the organization's largest fundraiser. Sunshine Division has worked to replace tungsten light with LED bulbs.

Some of the displays have been used since the event's inception. Some have been designed by professionals while others have been created by Hood to Coast, which organizes a relay race and helps Winter Wonderland with maintenance and storage during the off-season. New displays were added in 2017, when Winter Wonderland also hosted "Lights and Leashes Dog Walk Night" as well as "The Night of Holiday Misfits", which encouraged guests to dress in holiday costumes. The dog-walking evening returned in 2019. For the 2020 event, special safety precautions were required because of the COVID-19 pandemic. The bicycling and dog-friendly nights were canceled for 2020.

Most people experience the attraction from their vehicles, but Winter Wonderland has hosted select nights for pedestrians and bicyclists. In 2021, an evening was designated "Lights and Leashes Dog Walk Night", eliminating vehicles, bicycles, and strollers and only allowing pedestrians and dogs. There was also a scavenger hunt in 2021. The bicycling and dog walking nights returned in 2022. Approximately 1,500 people purchased tickets for the dog-walking evening. The bicycle and pedestrian evenings returned in 2023. In 2025, there was one night for bicyclists ("Bike the Lights") and two for dog walking ("Lights & Leashes Dog Walk"). Additionally, a second light tunnel was added in 2025.

== Reception ==
In 2019, Lakshmi Sadhu of the Daily Hive said the event has "become a Portland holiday tradition, and you can't really say you celebrated the holidays if you haven't visited the Safeway Winter Wonderland light event with your friends and family". Sadhu called the dog-friendly evenings "adorable". KATU called the event "one of Portland's favorite holiday light shows" in 2020. The Columbian included Winter Wonderland in a 2022 list of five light shows in the Portland metropolitan area that are "sure to produce ooohs and aaahs". Portland Monthly included Winter Wonderland in a 2025 list of eleven "must-see" holiday light displays in the metropolitan area.

== See also ==
- Christmas in Portland, Oregon
- Culture of Portland, Oregon
- Light art
- Portland Winter Light Festival
