= Pioneer Courthouse Square Christmas tree =

Christmas tree in Portland, Oregon, U.S.

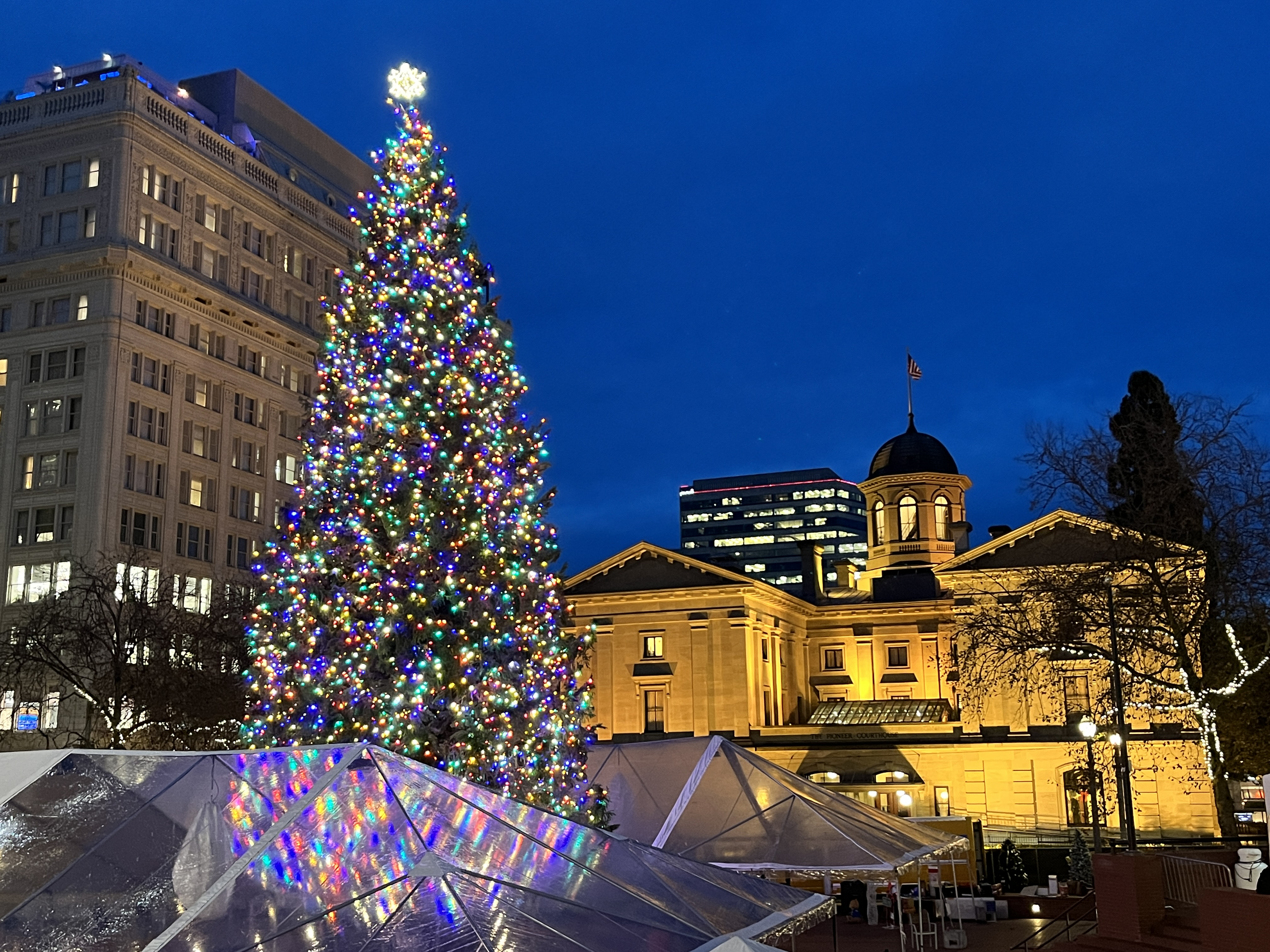
- The Christmas tree installed at Pioneer Courthouse Square, 2024
- Status: Active
- Frequency: Annually
- Venue: Pioneer Courthouse Square
- Location: Portland, Oregon
- Country: United States
- Years active: 41–42

In Portland, Oregon, Christmas trees have been installed at Pioneer Courthouse Square annually since the public space opened in 1984. The trees have been donated by Stimson Lumber Company since 2002, and are delivered the week of Veterans Day (November 11). With some exceptions, the trees are 75-foot-tall Douglas firs, decorated with thousands of multi-colored LED lights.

Tree lighting ceremonies are held annually and have been broadcast on local television stations and streamed online. Many have included sing-alongs led by Thomas Lauderdale and other members of Pink Martini, with additional participation by other local music groups. Among mayors to flip the light switch are Tom Potter, Sam Adams, Charlie Hales, and Ted Wheeler. Portland has also seen tree arrival ceremonies. In 2010, a Somali-American student plotted to set off a car bomb at the ceremony, and was subsequently arrested in an FBI sting.

== History ==
=== Trees ===
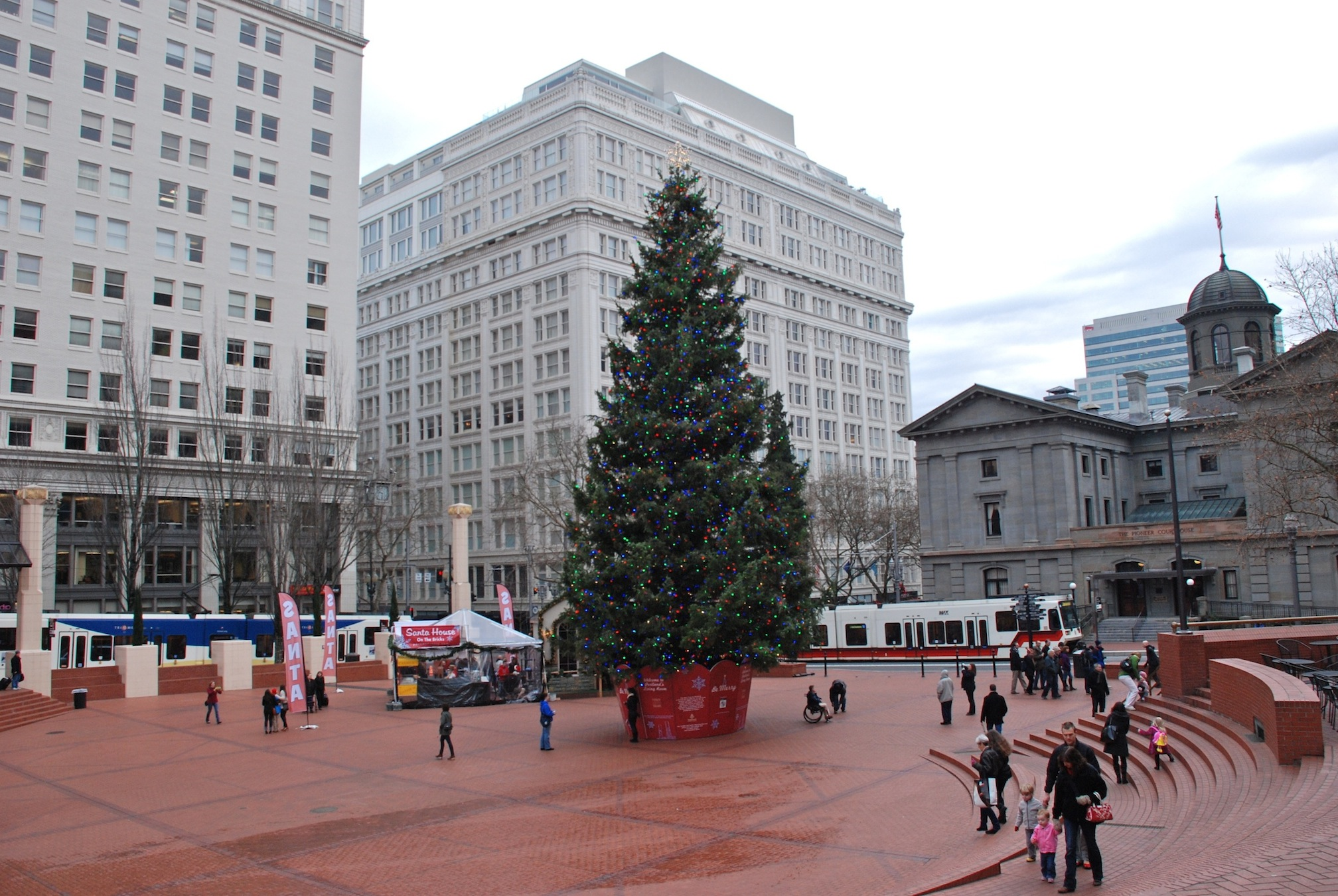
The Christmas tree in 2011

Christmas trees have been installed annually since Pioneer Courthouse Square opened in 1984. The 1997 tree was harvested from western Idaho. In 2003, the Portland State Vanguard said trees in past years were as tall as 90 feet. Since 2002, the trees (historically Douglas firs) have been donated by Stimson Lumber Company. According to Capital Press, the trees are at least 75 feet (23 m) tall and have a base diameter of less than 25 inches (2.1 ft) in order to fit into the stand. The trees are also usually "open grown" (given space for full development of branches and needles) and harvested from within 30 to 40 feet of a road, for hauling purposes. The trees are delivered to Pioneer Courthouse Square the week of Veterans Day (November 11). The process of harvesting, transporting, and installing the trees requires work by approximately 30 people over two days. Metal brackets are used to bolt branches to any bare spots.

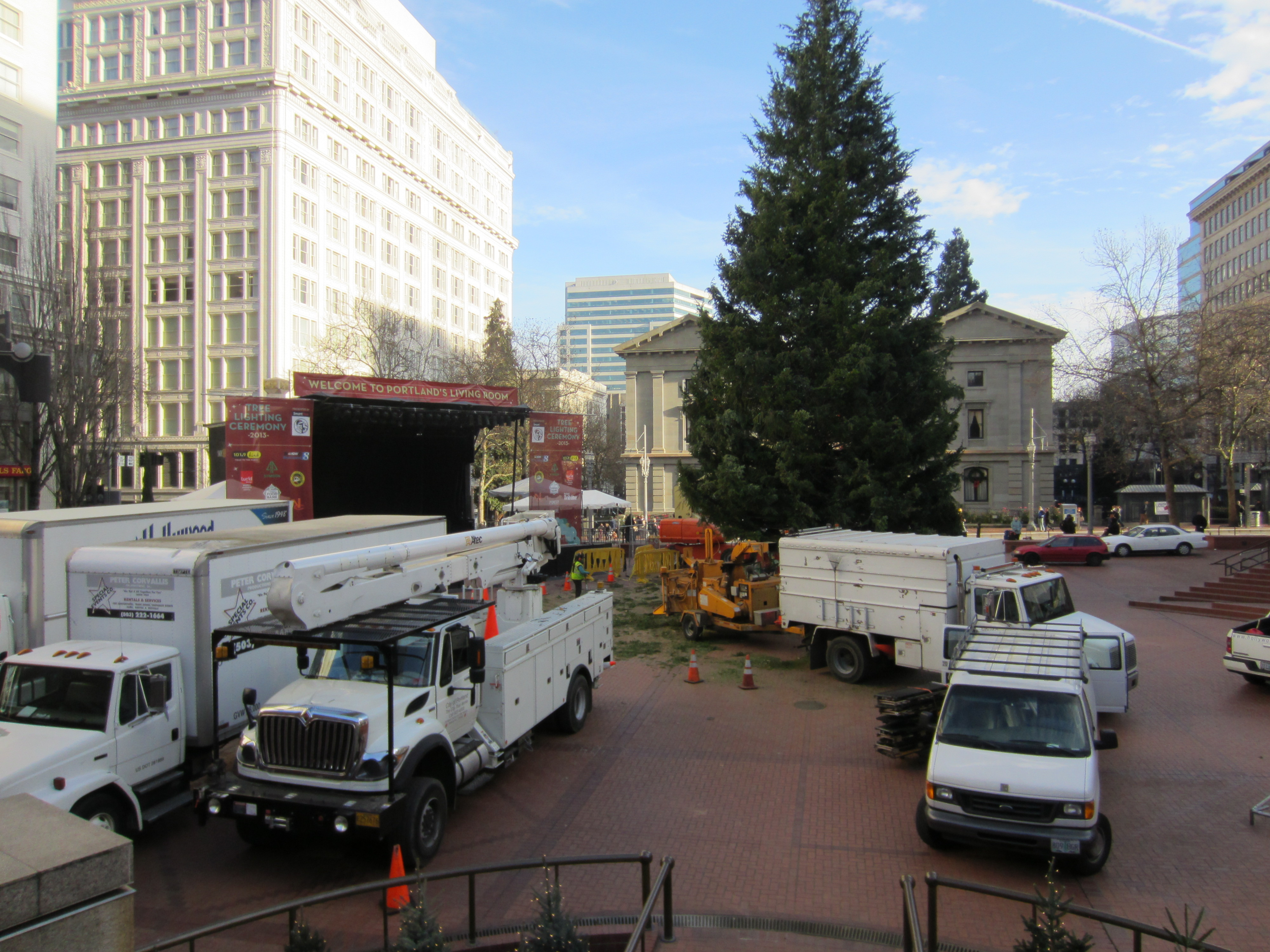
Tree preparations (2013)

The 2003 tree was a 75-foot tall Douglas fir that weighed 9,000 pounds and had more than 5,000 lights, the majority of which were purchased by a fundraising initiative with participation by United Way. The 2011 tree was the same height, grown near Gaston, and decorated with 14,000 multi-colored LED lights. The same number of lights were used in 2012. The 40-year-old tree in 2014 was also 75 feet tall and harvested near Henry Hagg Lake in Washington County.

In 2015, a 75 foot tall Douglas fir was decorated with 14,000 lights. The 2016 tree of the same size was originally 140 feet tall and weighed 13,000 pounds. Approximately 14,000 lights were used again from 2017 to 2019. The 75-foot-tall tree in 2017 was from the Gaston area and weighed 9,000 pounds. A 70-foot-tall tree from the same area was used in 2018, and a 75-foot-tall tree was used in 2019.

The 75-foot (23 m) tall Douglas fir in 2021 was from the Gaston area. The 2022 tree of the same height was grown in Clatsop County and weighed 8,500 pounds. It was decorated with 9,500–14,000 LED lights. In 2023, the 75-foot (23 m) tall tree was decorated with 9,500 LED lights. The 40-year-old, 8,000-pound Douglas fir was harvested from Stimson Lumber's Camp McGregor tree farm near Elsie, in the Northern Oregon Coast Range. In 2024, the approximately 35-year-old tree of the same size and type, grown near Gaston, had a base diameter of 17 inches and weighed close to 7,500 pounds. Harvested in Timber, the 2025 tree is 75 feet tall and weighs approximately 8,500–9,000 pounds. The Oregon-based, woman-owned trucking company Highway Heavy Hauling helped transport the tree. The 75-foot Douglas fir used in 2026 was grown in Gaston. It is 45 years old and weighs approximately 8,000 pounds.

=== Festivities and protests ===
==== Arrival ceremonies ====
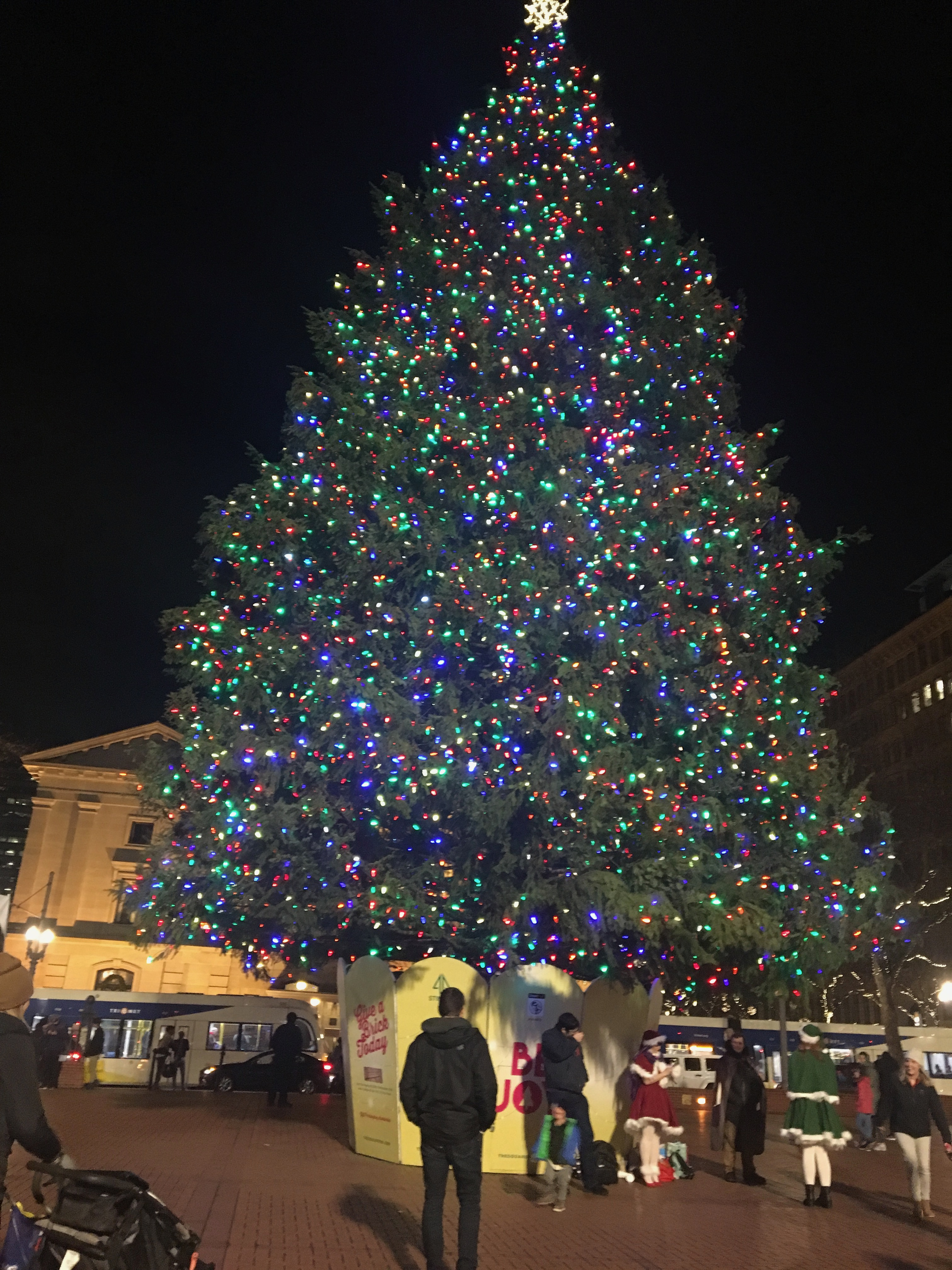
The tree at night in 2017

There have been festivities held for the tree's arrival in Portland. In 2012, the tree was escorted along Southwest 6th Avenue to the square by "Santa Claus", the Get a Life Marching Band, and Darigold's Farmalicious 1941 tractor. Peppermint hot chocolate was available to spectators for free. The tree arrival ceremony in 2015 included a parade with the Beat Goes On Marching Band, an appearance by "Santa Claus", a group of carolers, and free hot chocolate for attendees. The tree's 2017 arrival was part of a parade on the transit mall led by the March Fourth band. In 2021, the tree was greeted by someone dressed as Mrs. Claus, and "Lumberjack Santa" gave away candy canes to children. In 2025, dozens of people gathered for the tree's arrival at Pioneer Courthouse Square, including carolers, Thomas Lauderdale, "Lumberjack Santa", and others dressed as witches from Oz. The celebration also featured tuba players, cookies, and hot chocolate.

==== Lighting ceremonies ====
Tree lighting ceremonies are held annually. According to Beth Nakamura of The Oregonian, "For many Portlanders, the annual event marks the start of the holiday season." Mayor Tom Potter and "Santa Claus" flipped the switch to light the Christmas tree in 2007. In 2010, a Somali-American student attempted to set off a car bomb at the ceremony, which was attended by thousands of people. He was sentenced to 30 years in prison.

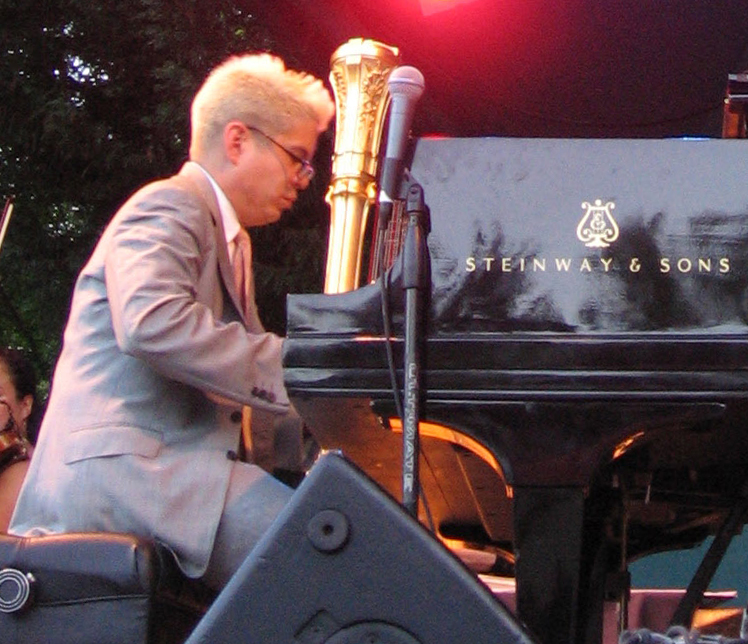
Thomas Lauderdale (pictured) of Pink Martini has led many sing-alongs at the annual lighting ceremonies.

The 2011 ceremony featured a sing-along led by Lauderdale and Pink Martini, with additional participation by members of the Oregon Symphony and the Pacific Youth Choir. The light switch was flipped by mayor Sam Adams, city commissioner Nick Fish, "Santa Claus", and Pioneer Courthouse Square president Phil Kalberer. Security was increased because of the car bomb plot in 2010 as well as possible demonstrations by Occupy Portland. The 2012 event also had a sing-along. Entertainment in 2014 included Pink Martini, the 234th Army Band, and the Northwest Community Gospel Choir.

Mayor Charlie Hales and "Santa Claus" flipped the switch at the 2016 ceremony. The 2017 and 2018 ceremonies also had sing-alongs led by Lauderdale and Pink Martini, and were attended by thousands. During the performance of "Have Yourself a Merry Little Christmas" (1943) in 2017, Lauderdale encouraged attendees to change the lyric "hang a shining star upon the highest bough" to "until then we'll have to muddle through somehow". Nakamura said the act "appeared to be a thinly veiled reference to the current political climate". The 234th Army Band and the Pacific Youth Choir also participated. In addition to Christmas music, the program acknowledged Hanukkah with a rendition of "I Have a Little Dreidel".

In 2019, the switch was flipped by mayor Ted Wheeler and "Santa Claus". The ceremony also featured Lauderdale and other members of Pink Martini, as well as other local musicians. The Pioneer Courthouse/SW 6th and Pioneer Place/SW 5th stations were closed for the event. Virtual ceremonies were held in 2020 and 2021, due to the COVID-19 pandemic. KGW broadcast an hour-long special with a sing-along led by Pink Martini in 2020.

Lauderdale performed at the 2022 ceremony, which was attended by hundreds of people despite the rain. A nonprofit organization distributed 3,000 $50 gift cards as part of an effort to support local businesses after the pandemic. The ceremony in 2023 included another sing-along led by Lauderdale, China Forbes, and other members of Pink Martini, with additional participation by Grant High School's Royal Blues Choir and Sam Barlow High School's Concert Choir. Approximately 200 pro-Palestinian demonstrators attended and chanted slogans during the ceremony.

Forbes, Lauderdale, and Pink Martini also performed at the 2024 ceremony, which was attended by thousands of people. The event also featured a sing-along and choral singers from the Royal Blues Choir, Gresham High School's Overtones, and Sam Barlow High School's Barlow Sound. Lauderdale lead a sing-along again in 2025.

== See also ==
- Christmas in Portland, Oregon
- Christmas tree cultivation
- Christmas tree production in the United States
- Culture of Portland, Oregon
