= Portland Spirit =

Yacht and tourist attraction in Portland, Oregon, U.S.

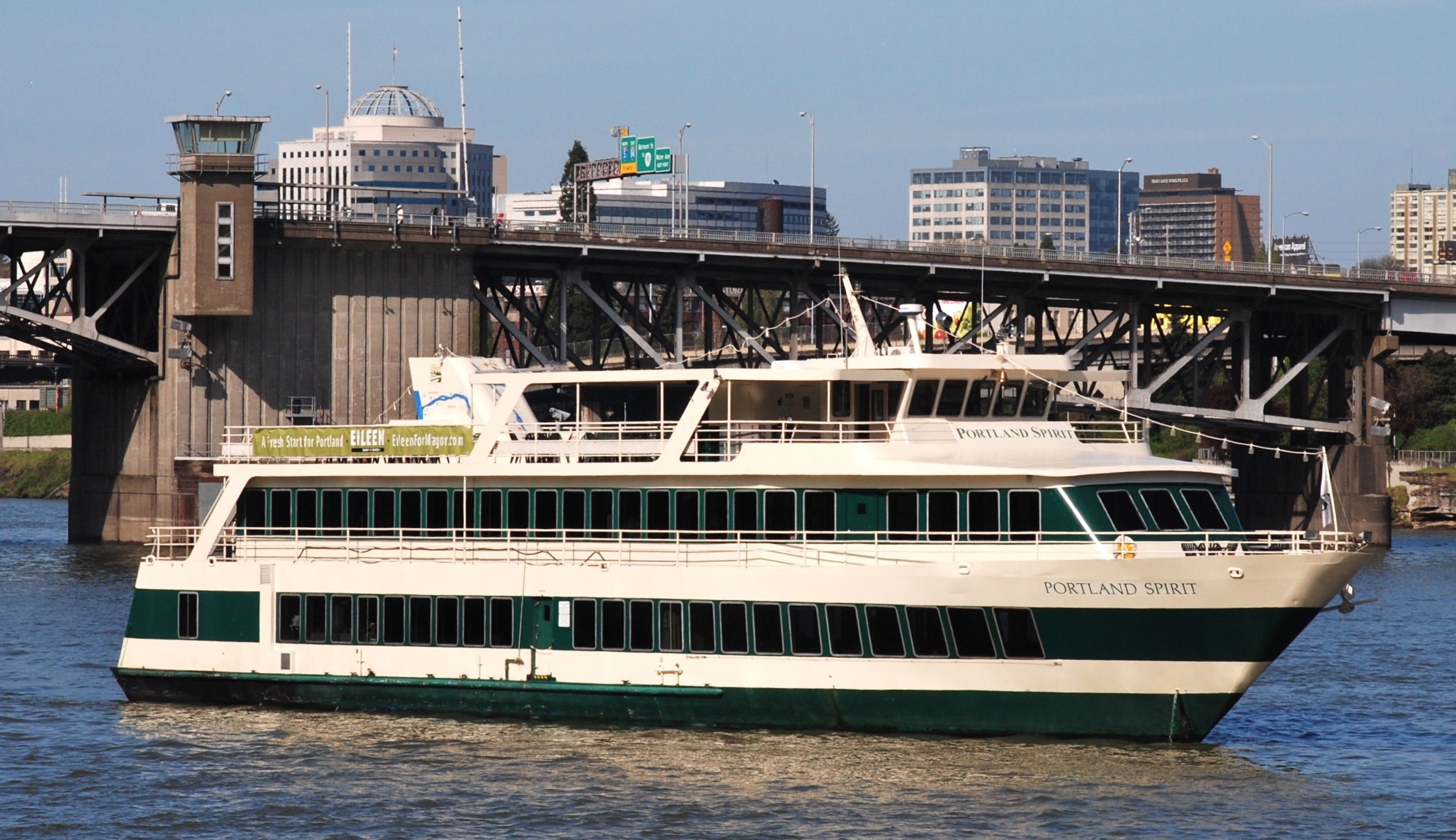
- The boat in 2012

History

United States
- Operator: American Waterways, Inc.
- Builder: Chesapeake Shipbuilding
- Launched: 1987
- Completed: August 27, 1986
- Maiden voyage: Connecticut River
- Identification: Call sign: WCZ7280; MMSI number: 367437970

History
- Name: Stardancer
- Operator: Pacific Marine

General characteristics
- Type: Passenger ship
- Displacement: 345 long tons (351 t)
- Length: 150 feet (46 m) LOA; 128 feet (39 m) LWL
- Beam: 36 feet (11 m)
- Draft: 7 feet (2.1 m)
- Installed power: 2 Caterpillar C-18 engines, diesel
- Speed: 12 knots (22 km/h; 14 mph)
- Capacity: 499

Portland Spirit is a 98-foot (30 m) yacht and tourist attraction based on the Willamette River in Portland, Oregon, United States. The cruise company was established in 1991 and the boat has been based there since May 1994.

In 2004, Portland Spirit acquired the rights to host a Cinnamon Bear Cruise. In 2017, a judge suspended the boat's captain for running into other boats during an event in 2015. The boat was docked for three months during the COVID-19 pandemic.
