= Swiss Hibiscus =

Restaurant in Portland, Oregon, U.S.

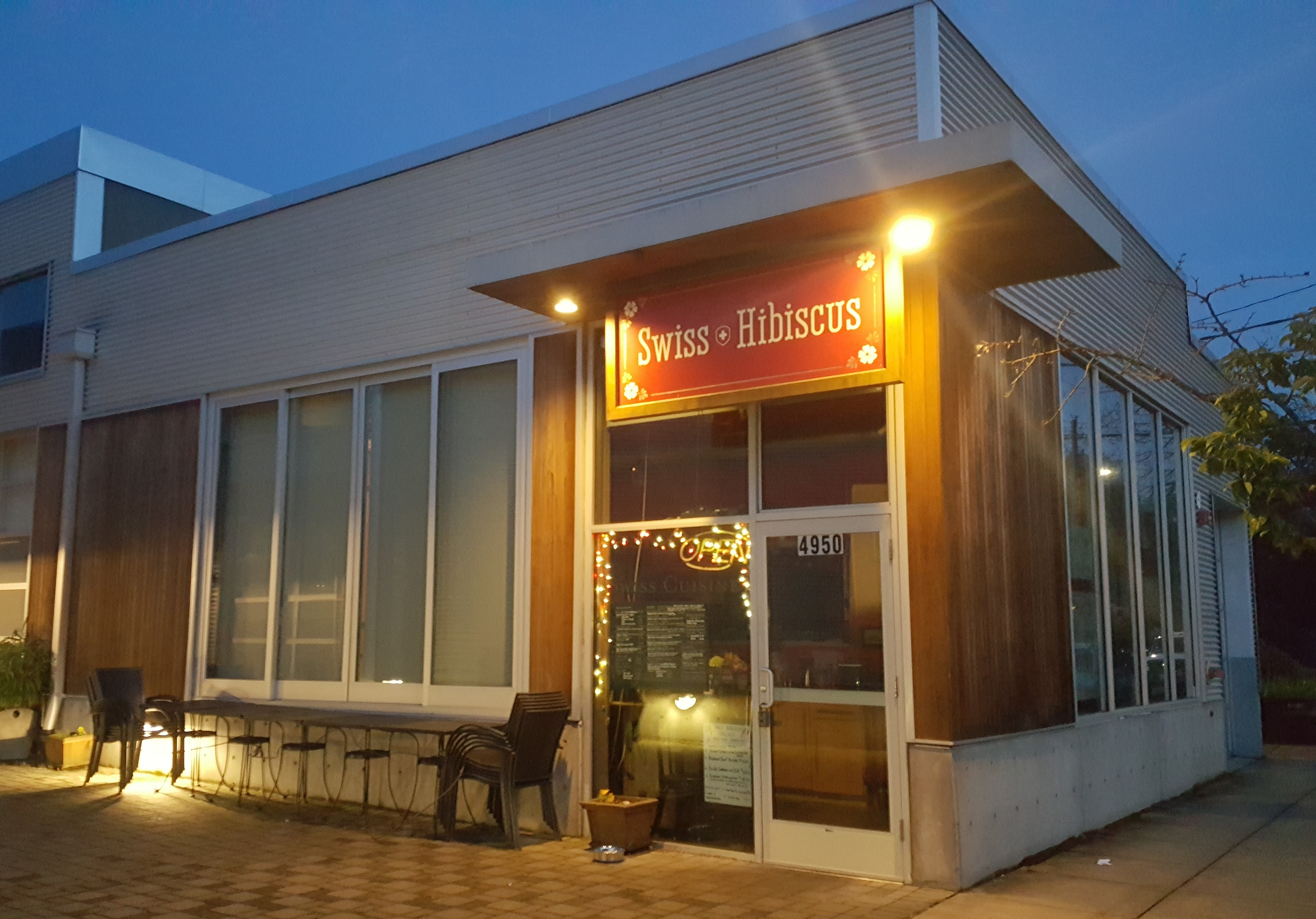
- The restaurant's exterior at night, 2022
- Interactive map of Swiss Hibiscus

Restaurant information
- Established: 2010
- Dress code: European
- Location: 4950 Northeast 14th Avenue, Portland, Multnomah, Oregon, 97211, United States
- Coordinates: 45°33′32″N 122°39′05″W
- Website: swisshibiscus.com

Swiss Hibiscus (formerly Café Hibiscus) is a restaurant in Portland, Oregon. It serves European cuisine and has been featured on the Food Network's Diners, Drive-Ins and Dives.

== Description ==
Swiss Hibiscus serves European cuisine on 14th Avenue, near Alberta Street, in northeast Portland's King neighborhood. Sources have described the restaurant as Alpine, Swiss, and "Hawaii meets Switzerland". The interior features Hawaiian decor. The menu has included sautéed mushrooms, lentil and onion soups, paprika schnitzel served in a mushroom cream sauce, émincé zurichoise, fondue, goulash, spätzle, and a vegan version of rösti (Swiss hash brown pancake). The restaurant serves roast goose, tournedos (beef tenderloin) or salmon for Christmas dinner.

== History ==
Dani Thiel and Jennie Wyss opened Cafe Hibiscus in 2010. Tammy Hay is also credited as a co-owner. The restaurant later rebranded as Swiss Hibiscus.

Guy Fieri visited the restaurant for an episode of the Food Network's Diners, Drive-Ins and Dives.

== See also ==
- List of Diners, Drive-Ins and Dives episodes
