= Shandong (restaurant) =

Chinese restaurant in Portland, Oregon, U.S.

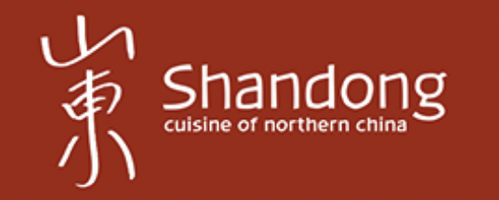

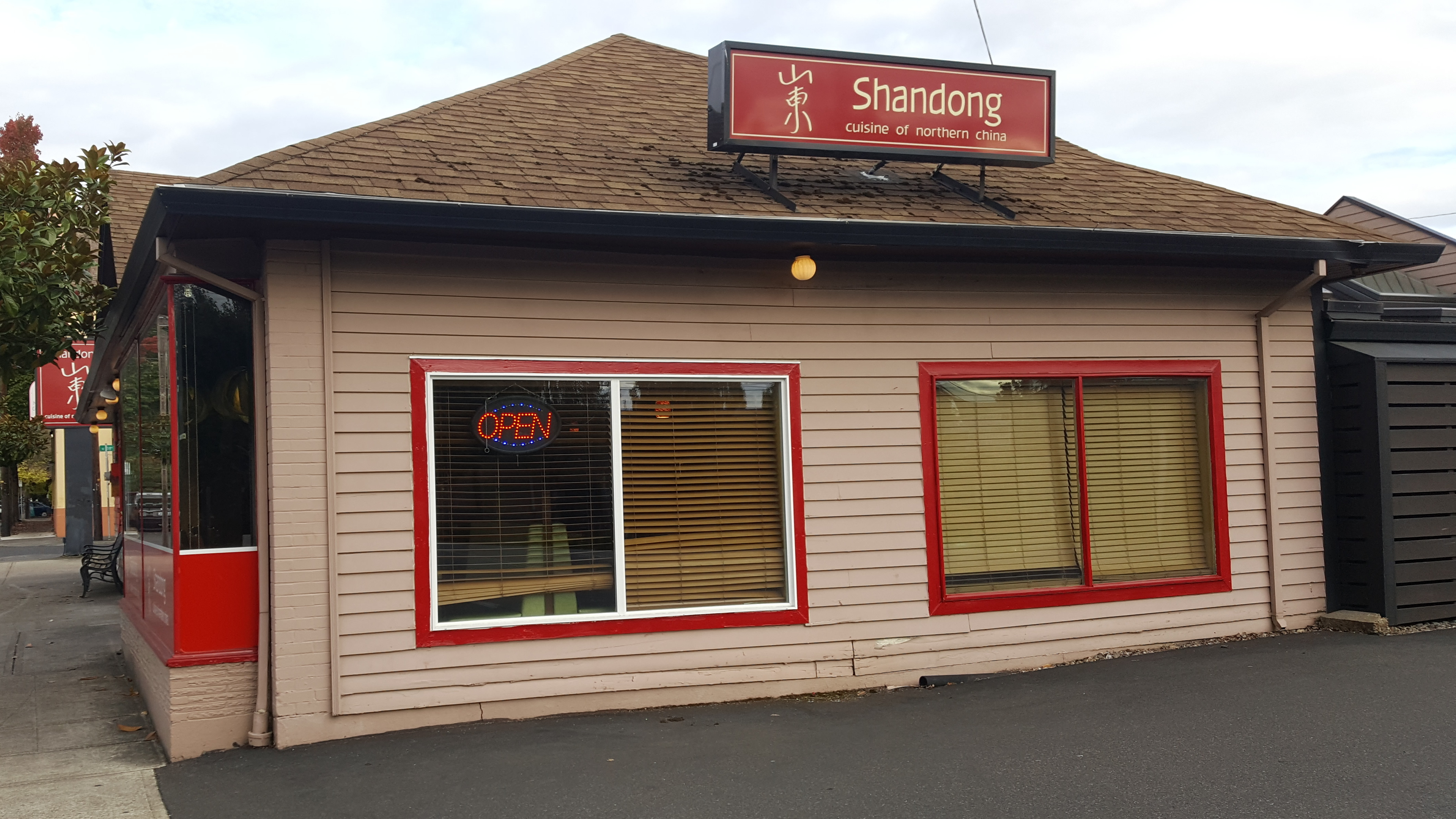
- The restaurant's exterior in 2021
- Interactive map of Shandong

Restaurant information
- Food type: Chinese
- Location: 3724 Northeast Broadway Street, Portland, Multnomah, Oregon, 97232, United States
- Coordinates: 45.5350°N 122.6244°W
- Website: shandongtogo.com

Shandong is a Chinese restaurant in Portland, Oregon, United States. Named after China's Shandong province, the restaurant is owned by chef Henry Liu and serves traditional Chinese cuisine in northeast Portland's Hollywood neighborhood. It has garnered a positive reception.

== Description ==
Shandong is a popular Chinese restaurant in northeast Portland's Hollywood neighborhood, named after China's Shandong province. Portland Monthly says, "Sporting sleek and modern decor, this Chinese spot serves up fresh, house-made eats from the Shandong province and offers a daily 4–6 happy hour." The menu features traditional Chinese cuisine such as beef, dumplings (including a shrimp variety with ginger and scallion), fried rice, Kung Pao chicken, mu shu chicken (chicken with cabbage, egg, and willow tree mushrooms) served with hand-rolled pancakes, noodles, potstickers, and tan tan. Judy's Noodles is a noodle dish with spinach, scallions, garlic, and jalapeño.

== History ==
Shandong is owned by chef Henry Liu. In 2015, Liu and business partner Vo Chien opened Shandong's Sichuan-focused sister restaurant Kung Pow! in northwest Portland, offering a spicier version of Shandong's menu.

Shandong operated via takeout and delivery at times in 2020, during the COVID-19 pandemic.

== Reception ==
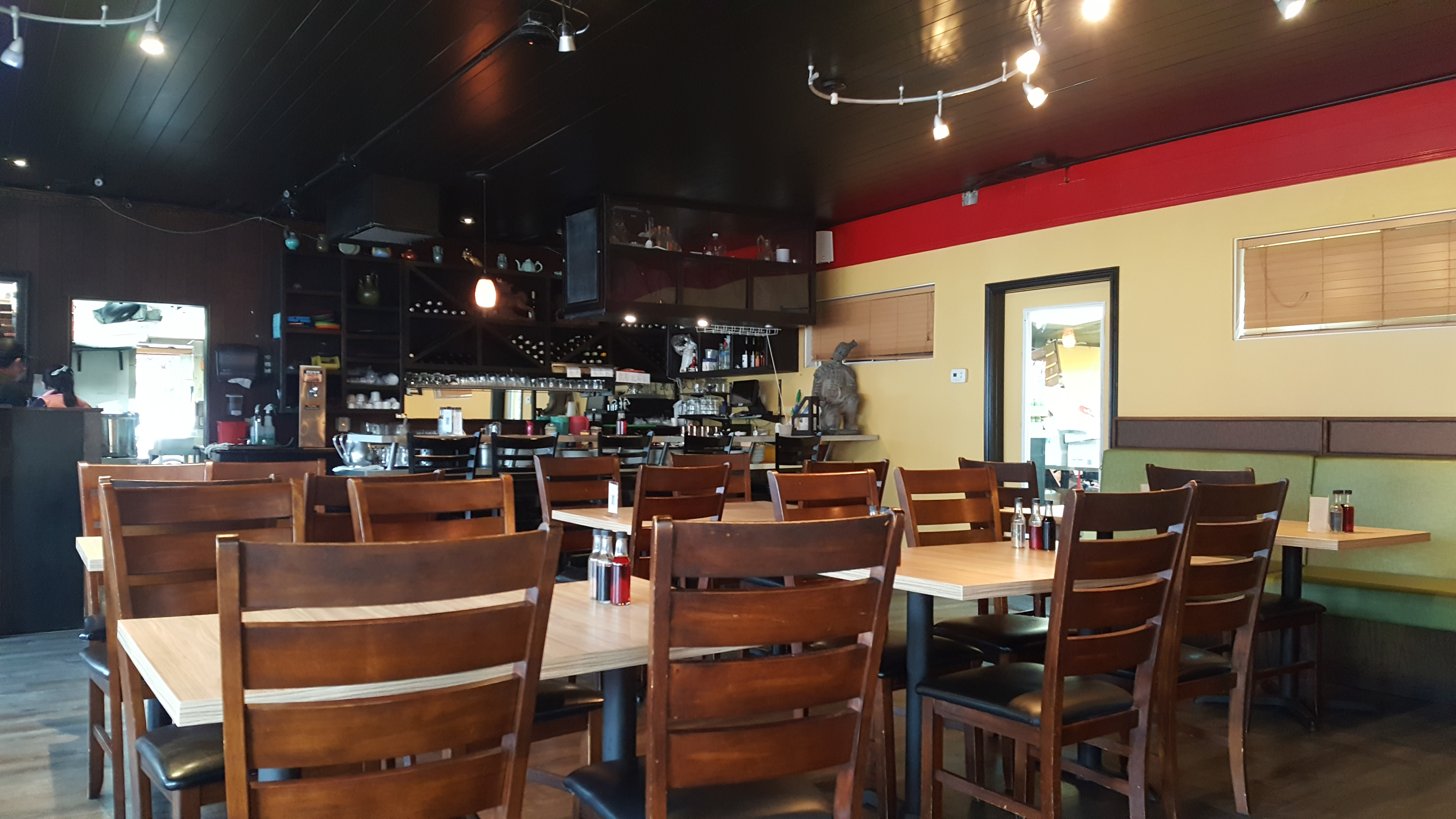
The restaurant's interior, 2021

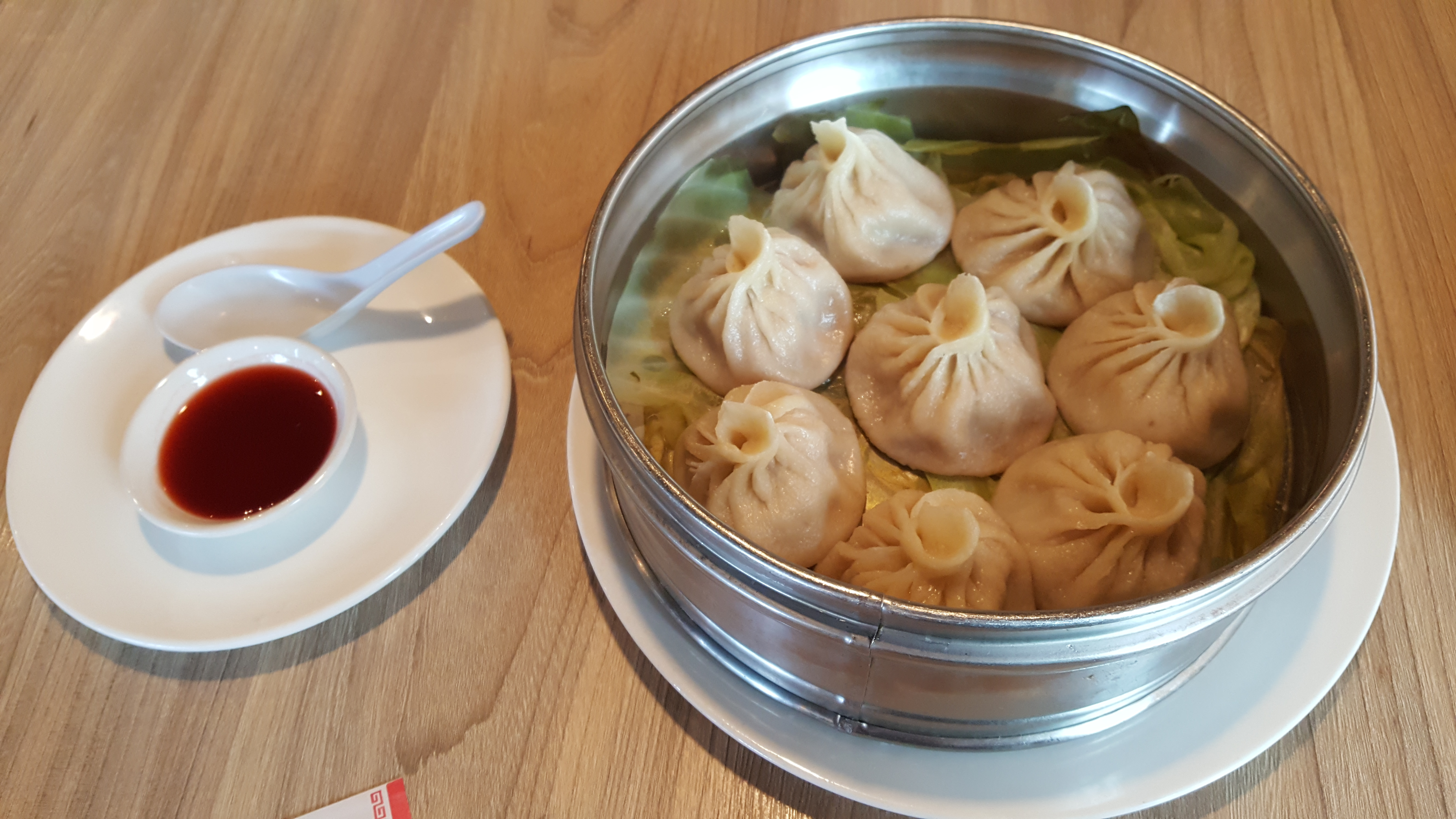
Pork soup dumplings

In his 2011 review of the restaurant, Portland Mercury's Tony Perez complimented the mu shu chicken, noodles, and shrimp dumplings, but was disappointed by the bean sauce and spicy peanut sauce. He summarized, "Shandong is a step up in some ways—it's not the all-too-familiar gut-bomb experience of some of its greasier MSG-laden brethren, and the high points demonstrate some clear skill in the kitchen—but it's not joining the upper echelon either. If you're craving some Chinese staples, by all means, go... just manage your expectations better than I did." In her 2014 book Food Lovers' Guide to Portland, Oregon, Laurie Wolf wrote:

When we first ate at Shandong, we were so happy to find an excellent example of the cuisine of Northern China, one of my favorite areas for culinary delights. Dumplings and wontons are crisp and perfectly fried, not greasy, and the sweet and sour soup was the best I have had in PDX. The beef and pork dishes were also excellent, and we totally loved the house-made noodles, done just right. The service is attentive and the place is modern, clean, and comfortable.

In 2015, Eater Portland's Danielle Centoni called Shandong "one of Northeast Portland's most popular Chinese restaurants". The website's Nathan Williams included the restaurant in a 2022 list of fourteen "standout" restaurants in the "eclectic" Hollywood District. In 2016, Willamette Week's Matthew Korfhage said Shandong serves a "subdued, better-than-most ode to its titular province". The newspaper included Judy's Noodles in a 2018 list of "our favorite noodle bowls and plates in Portland for less than $15" and said, "Among the many chopstick-thick, fresh-made noodles at Northeast Broadway's Shandong, the best by far are the simplest." The business ranked second in the Best Chinese Restaurant category of the newspaper's annual Best of Portland readers' poll in 2024.

Clarissa Wei included Shandong in CNN's 2017 list of the fifty best Chinese restaurants in the U.S., writing:

Shandong offers 'a new look at classic dishes' in a pleasant though simple dining room. The ginger-infused, hand-rolled pot stickers are large and one of the best-selling items. There are also freshly hand-pulled noodles and a unique deep-fried pork dish cooked in a cherry and ginger sauce. Cheap happy hour appetizers, such as pan-Pacific wontons, Chilean rock crab and shiitake dumplings, are available from 4 p.m. to 6 p.m. Is this the cutting edge of Chinese cuisine? A growing number of devotees think so.

== See also ==
- List of Chinese restaurants
