= Tubachristmas =

Musical event celebrating the Tuba instrument family

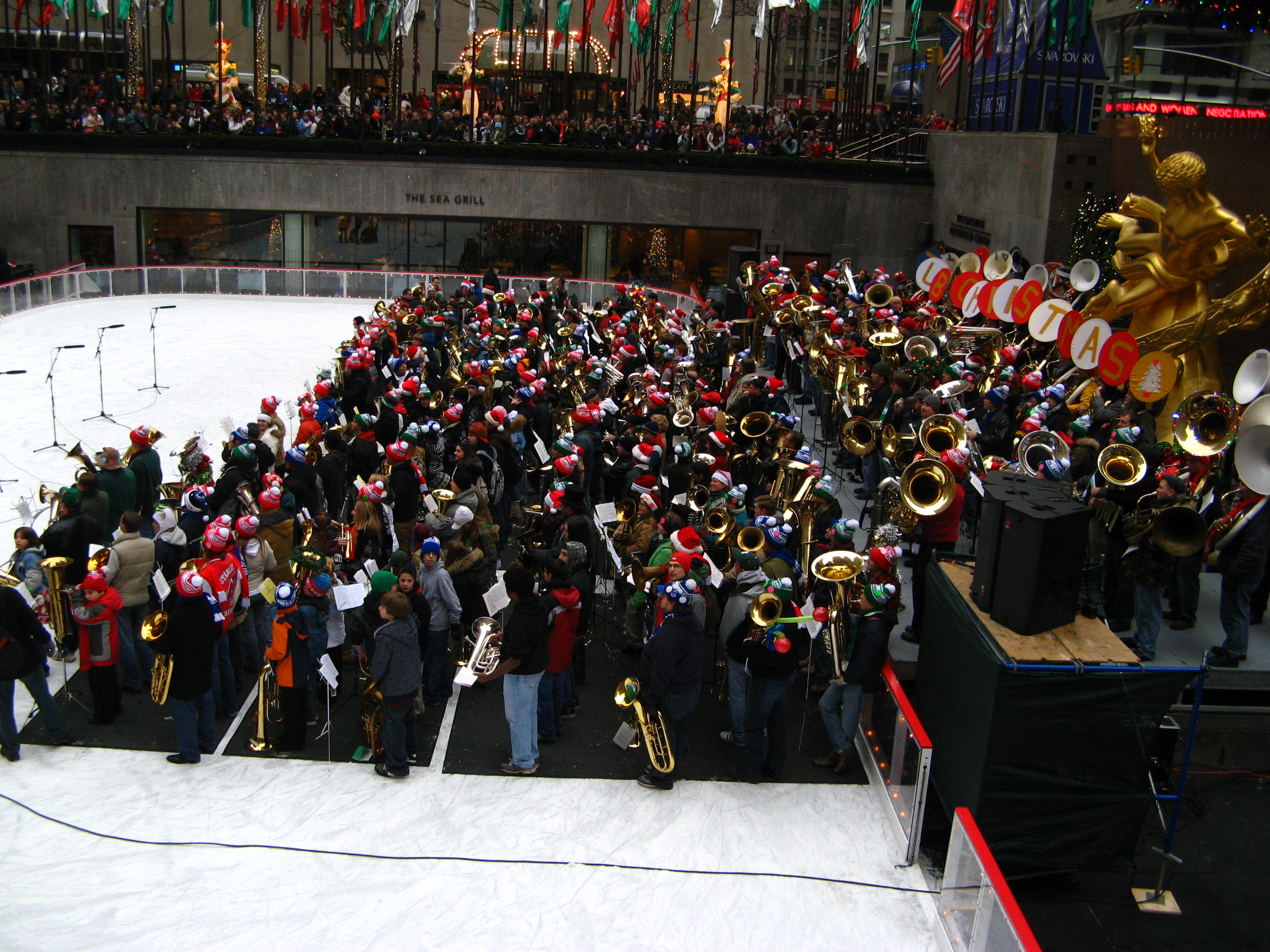
TubaChristmas 2007, ice rink at Rockefeller Center, New York City

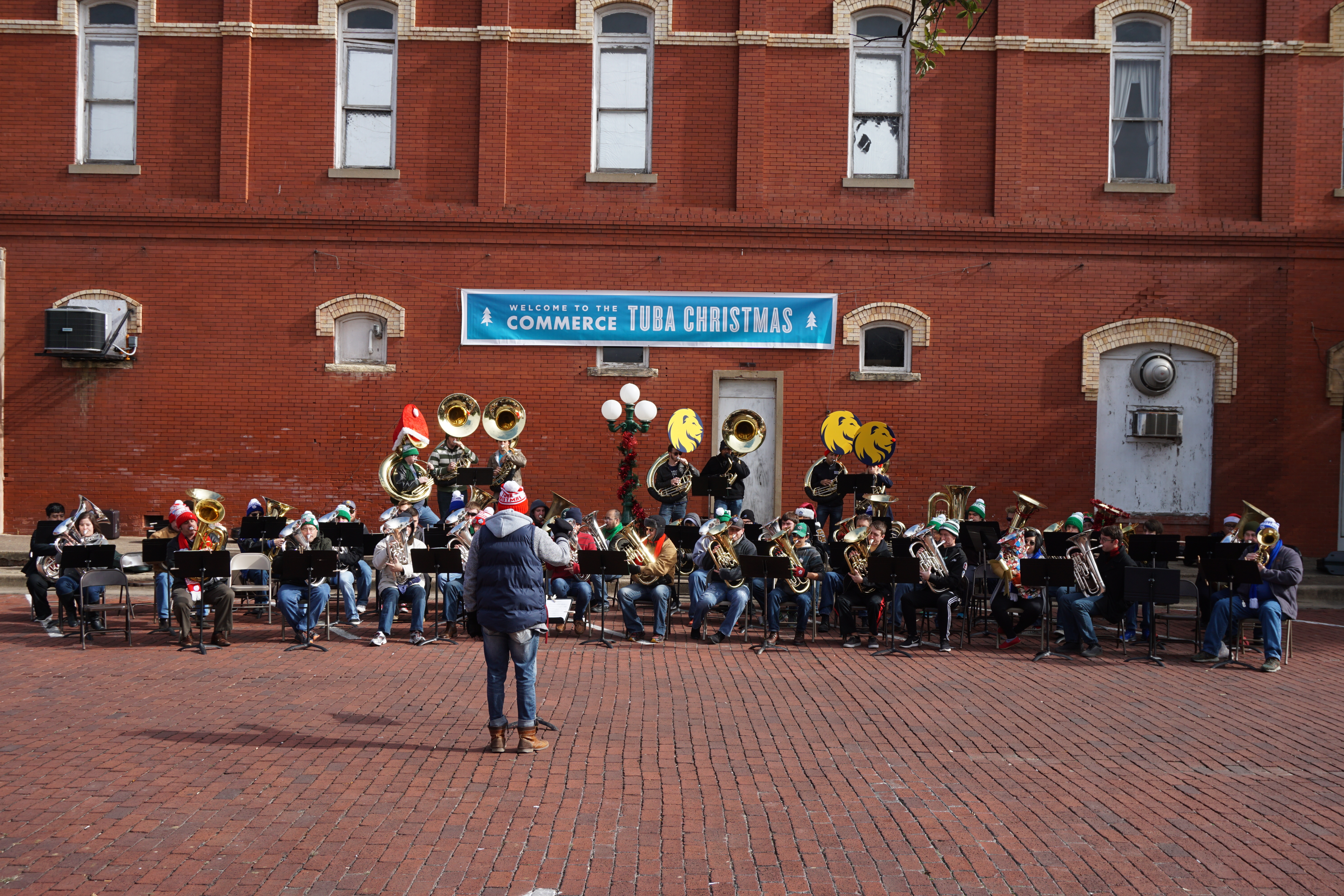
TubaChristmas 2016 in Commerce, Texas

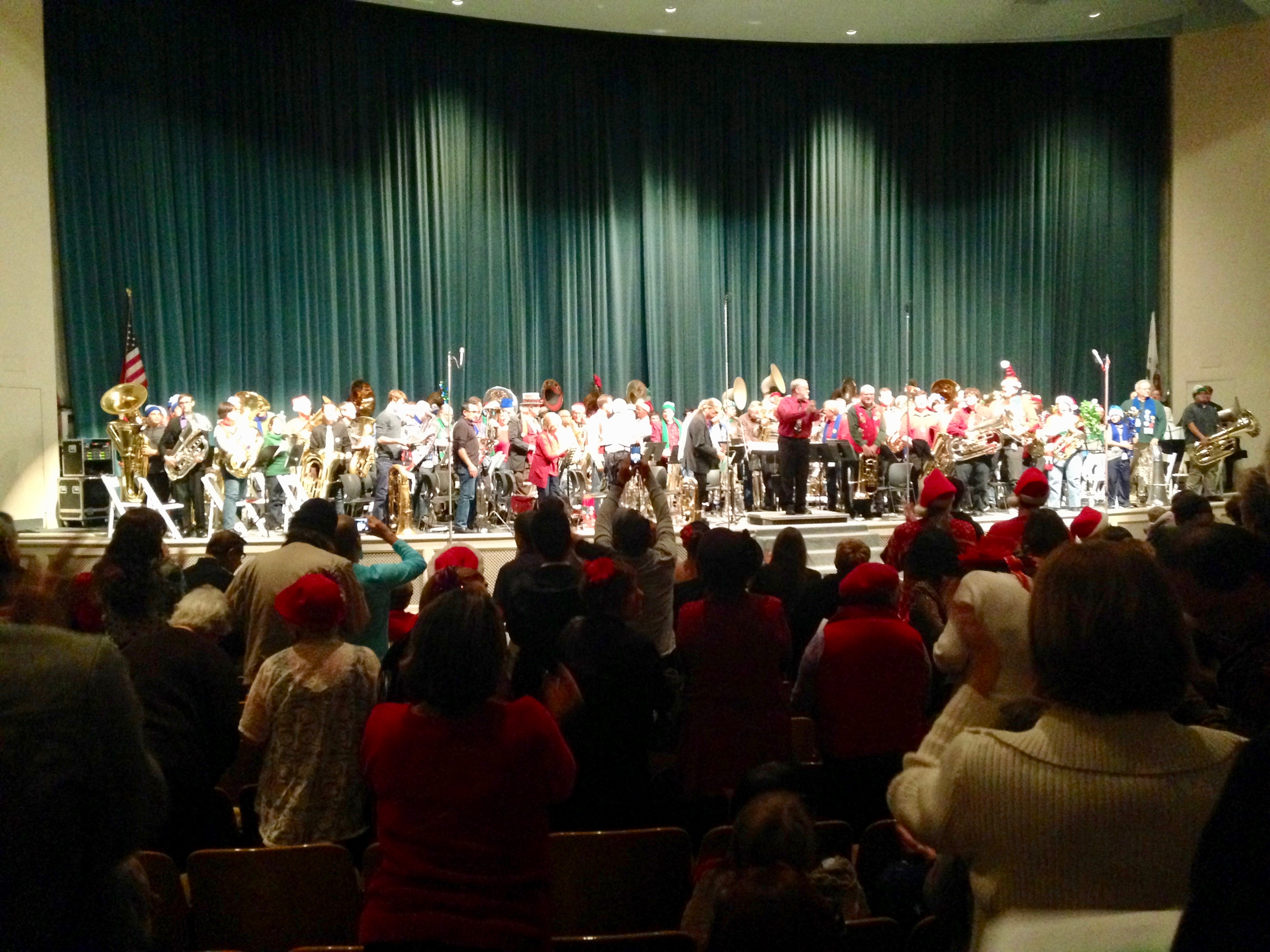
Tubachristmas 2014 at Forest Lawn Memorial in Glendale, Los Angeles, CA.

TubaChristmas is a music concert held in cities worldwide that celebrates those who play, teach, and compose music for instruments in the tuba family, including the tuba, sousaphone, baritone, and euphonium. Some participants also bring rarer members of the family such as the helicon, ophicleide, serpent and double bell euphonium.

The first TubaChristmas was organized by Harvey G. Phillips to honor his tuba teacher William Bell, who was born on Christmas Day 1902. It was held December 22, 1974, in the ice skating rink at New York City's Rockefeller Center, conducted by Paul Lavalle. Over 300 musicians participated in that inaugural concert, beginning a holiday tradition. The arrangements of the Christmas carols were arranged by Alec Wilder, who coincidentally died on Christmas Eve 1980.

Convincing Rockefeller Center to allow hundreds of tubas to play on the ice rink was challenging. Phillips had to provide the unlisted telephone numbers of some of his friends, including Leopold Stokowski, Leonard Bernstein, Andre Kostelanetz, and Morton Gould. After checking his references, Phillips' concert was allowed.

TubaChristmas concerts vary in size from a quartet (two euphoniums and two tubas), to several hundred at their largest events. Musicians can play in a TubaChristmas concert by playing an instrument in the tuba family (conical bore). There is a nominal participant registration fee.

The TubaChristmas version of "Jingle Bells", arranged by Norlan Bewley, incorporates the trio section of the "National Emblem" march by Edwin Eugene Bagley before returning to the "Jingle Bells" melody.

TubaChristmas coordinators in New York City include Michael Salzman, a former student of Harvey Phillips at Indiana University and current tuba and euphonium professor at Hofstra University; and Gary Press, private instructor of low brass and a former professional NYC freelance musician.

== See also ==
- Tuba Christmas (Portland, Oregon)
