= Sunshine Division =

Organization based in Portland, Oregon, U.S.

- Logo
- Formation: 1923; 103 years ago
- Location: Portland, Oregon, United States
- Website: sunshinedivision.org

Sunshine Division is a food relief nonprofit organization based in Portland, Oregon, United States.

Established in 1923, Sunshine Division was originally a division of the Portland Police Bureau (PPB). The organization is headquartered on Northwest Front Avenue and operates a food pantry in southeast Portland. Previously, Sunshine Division had a food pantry in north Portland. Sunshine Division and the PPB have partnered to host "Shop with a Cop".

== See also ==
- Winter Wonderland (Portland, Oregon)
