= Harvey Phillips =

American tubist (1929–2010)

- Born: Harvey Gene Phillips, Sr. December 2, 1929; Aurora, Missouri, United States
- Died: October 20, 2010 (aged 80); Bloomington, Indiana, United States
- Genres: Jazz, classical
- Occupation: Musician
- Instrument: Tuba

Harvey Gene Phillips Sr. (December 2, 1929 – October 20, 2010) was an American tuba player. He served as the Distinguished Professor of the Jacobs School of Music at Indiana University, Bloomington (from 1971 to 1994) and was dedicated advocate for the tuba becoming popularly known as Mr. Tuba.

== Biography ==
Born in Aurora, Missouri, Phillips was a professional freelance musician in New York City from 1950 to 1971, winning his first professional position with the Ringling Bros. and Barnum & Bailey Circus Band as a teenager. In 1954, he co-founded the New York Brass Quintet, which is credited with popularizing the brass quintet in its most common form: 2 trumpets, 1 trombone, 1 horn, and 1 tuba. In 1960, he co-founded The All-Star Concert Band with American cornet soloist James F. Burke. The band recorded three albums and was composed of virtually every top soloist and first chair player in the country. He served as personnel manager for Symphony of the Air, Leopold Stokowski, Igor Stravinsky, and Gunther Schuller. He was a key figure in the formation of the International Tuba Euphonium Association (formerly T.U.B.A.) and the founder and president of the Harvey Phillips Foundation, Inc. which administers Octubafest, Tubachristmas, Tubasantas, Tubacompany, and Tubajazz.

In 2007, Phillips was inducted into the American Classical Music Hall of Fame, the only wind instrument player to receive this prestigious honor. Other inductees that year included Yo-Yo Ma, Donald Martino and the Cleveland Orchestra.

He died of Parkinson's in Bloomington, aged 80.

== Awards ==
- Principal Tuba, Circus Hall of Fame Band
- Honorary Doctor of Music New England Conservatory (1971)
- Harvey Phillips Day has been celebrated by the New England conservatory (1971) and by his home town Bi-Centennial Celebration, Marionville, Missouri (1976)
- Kappa Kappa Psi Distinguished Service to Music Medal (1979)
- Governor of Missouri declared a Harvey Phillips Weekend (1985)
- Honorary Doctor of Humanities University of Missouri (1987)
- Association of Concert Bands "first" Mentor Ideal Award (1994)
- Sousa Foundation Sudler Medal of the Order of Merit award (1995)
- National Band Association Academy of Wind and Percussion Arts Award (1995)
- United Musical Instruments Lifetime Achievement Award (1996)
- American Bandmasters Association Edwin Franco Goldman Award (1996)
- Rafael Mendez Brass Institute Lifetime Achievement Award (1997)
- Colonial Euphonium-Tuba Institute Development of Musical Artistry & Opportunities Award (1997)
- Phi Mu Alpha Orpheus Award (1997)
- Inducted into the Classical Music Hall of Fame (2007)
- Indiana University President's Award for Excellence (2008)
- Inducted into the Windjammers Unlimited, Inc. Hall of Fame (2010)

== Discography ==
With John R. Barrows

- Harvey Phillips Presents "Tribute To a Friend" (Golden Crest Records, 1975)

With Kenny Burrell

- Blues - The Common Ground (Verve, 1968)

With Gil Evans Orchestra

- New Bottle Old Wine (World Pacific, 1958)
- Into the Hot (Impulse!, 1961)

With Curtis Fuller

- Cabin in the Sky (Impulse!, 1962)

With Dizzy Gillespie

- Perceptions (Verve, 1961)

With John Lewis

- Odds Against Tomorrow (Soundtrack) (United Artists, 1959)
- The Golden Striker (Atlantic, 1960)

With Wes Montgomery

- Movin' Wes (Verve, 1962)

With Gus Vali & His Orchestra

- A Greek in Dixieland (United Artists, 1958)

With Matteson-Phillips Tubajazz Consort

- The Matteson-Phillips Tubajazz Consort (Mark Records, 1977)
- Superhorn (Mark Records, 1998)
