= Snow Day Village =

Annual pop-up exhibit in Portland, Oregon, U.S.

- The installation's logo
- Artist: Mike Bennett (Mike Bennett Studios)
- Year: 2022–present
- Location: Portland, Oregon, U.S.

Snow Day Village is an annual pop-up exhibit by American artist Mike Bennett and his studio in Portland, Oregon. The seasonal, family-friendly exhibit has original artwork, a gift shop, and other features and activities such as goats, live music, and singers.

The project started as Snow Day at a hotel in downtown Portland in 2022. Snow Day Village operated at Director Park in 2024 and 2025. The exhibit has been sponsored by Downtown Portland Clean & Safe in partnership with the City of Portland and Portland Metro Chamber.

== History ==
The Snow Day exhibit in 2022 was held in a space attached to the downtown Portland's Ace Hotel (pictured in 2009).

In 2022, Bennett presented the exhibit Snow Day in an event space attached to the Ace Hotel on 10th Avenue in downtown Portland, from November 25 to December 31. The pop-up had a gift shop and original artwork.

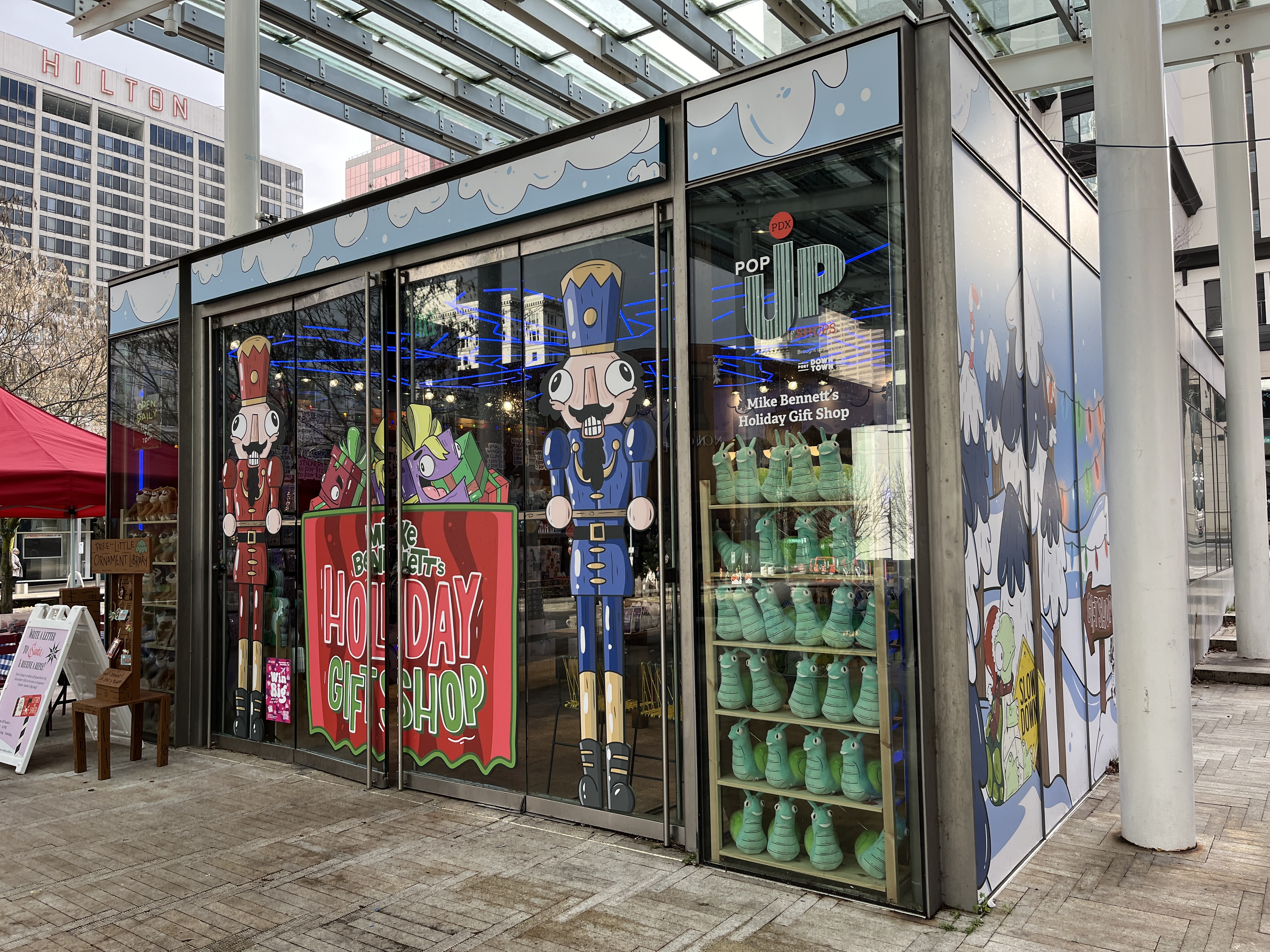
Exterior of "Mike Bennett's Holiday Gift Shop", a component of Snow Day Village, in Director Park, downtown Portland (2024)

The exhibit moved to Director Park in 2024. The "grand opening" of Snow Day Village on November 15 included a ribbon cutting, characters, goats, and music. The shop also debuted stuffed animals based on his visual work. Snow Day Village was sponsored by Downtown Portland Clean & Safe as part of the 'PDX Pop-Up Shop' program, in conjunction with the City of Portland and Portland Metro Chamber. The exhibit had many features and activities throughout the season, including a retail outlet called "Mike Bennett's Holiday Gift Shop", carolers, and goats. The letter box called "Santa's Mailbox" allowed children to send and receive letters to and from Santa Claus. "Timed Snowfalls" occurred at noon, 2pm, and 4pm, generating environmentally-friendly "snow". The "Giving Tree" was an ornament exchange introduced in collaboration with the local organization Central City Concern. It allowed people to select an ornament from a tree, purchase the ornament's featured gift from a child in need's wish list, then return the gift to Director Park for distribution via Central City Concern. Downtown Portland Clean & Safe said the 2024 exhibit saw 50,000 visitors, 47 activities, 120 ornament exchange participants, 300 letter box deliveries, and an estimated economic impact of $1.5 million.

In 2025, Snow Day Village returned to Director Park on November 15. In addition to the gift shop, letter box to Santa, and ornament exchange, the exhibit featured artificial snow generated by a snow machine, fire pits and s'mores, goats, and live music. Through January 3, 2026, people could participate in a scavenger hunt to locate Gilly the Goldfish, who "escaped" from Bennett's marine life-themed art installation Portland Aquarium (2025–2026). Participants picked up scavenger hunt sheets at Snow Day Village.

In 2026, Snow Day Village returned in the form Mike Bennett's Dead Media: Holiday Special, a "holiday edition" of Dead Media Video Rentals, which was a haunted house-themed installation at Mike Bennett Studios in northeast Portland's Irvington neighborhood. Holiday Special was installed in the downtown Portland space that previously housed Portland Aquarium. Similar to Dead Media Video Rentals, Holiday Special features cartoon characters of holiday films. According to Hannah Siebold of the Portland Tribune, the installation "blends the charm of a vintage VHS rental store with elements of Bennett's popular Snow Day Village" and has "familiar characters, playful details and a touch of spooky humor". The free and family-friendly installation opened on November 13, 2026.

== Reception ==
KATU has described the exhibit as "cute" and "family-friendly". In 2026, Kate Hagan Gallup of ParentMap called Snow Day Village a "family favorite" and quipped, "where else can you find a combination of snail plushies, live goats, and fake snow falling from the sky?"

== See also ==
- Christmas in Portland, Oregon
- Culture of Portland, Oregon
