= Crows in Portland, Oregon =

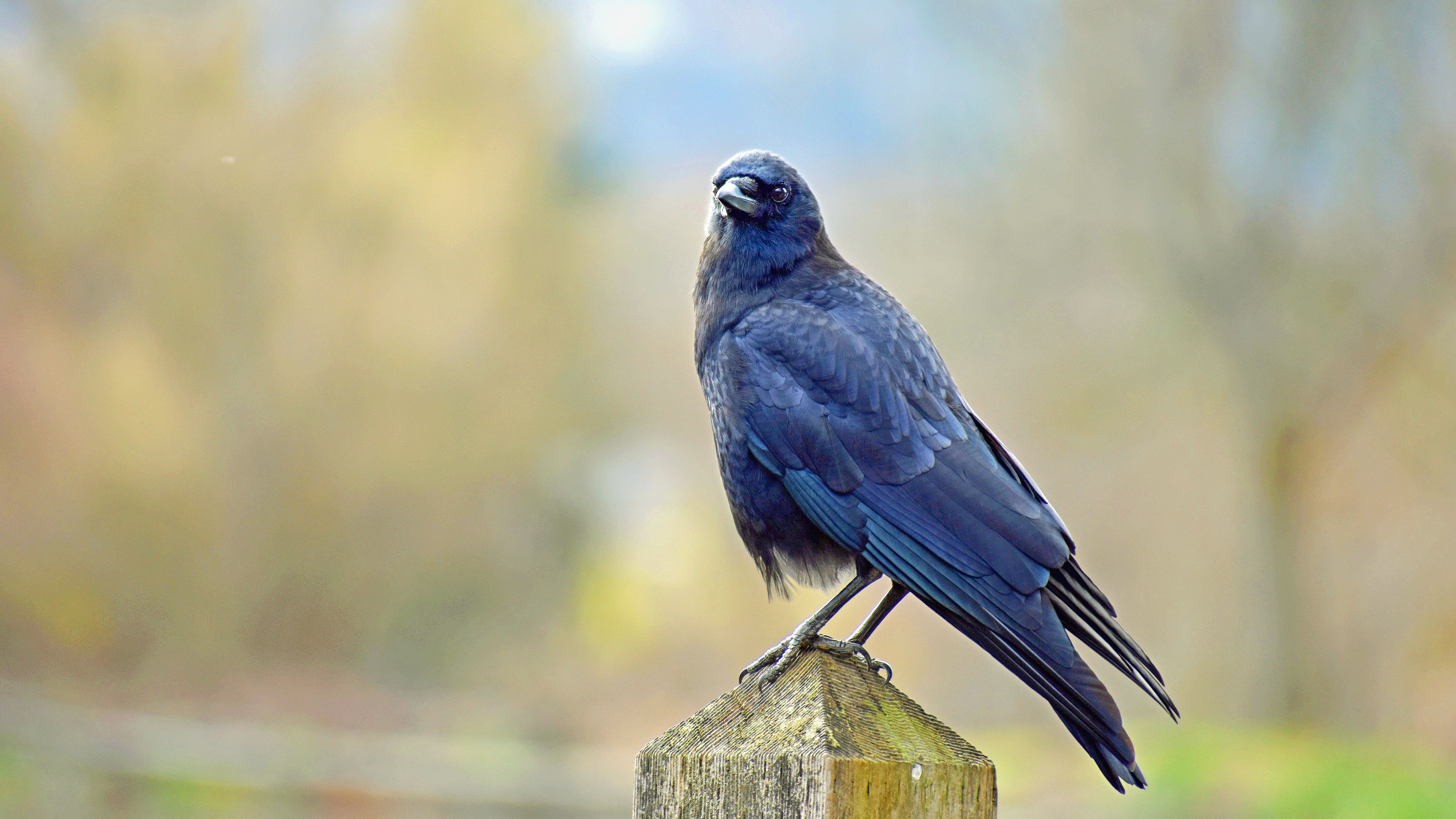
A crow at Crystal Springs Rhododendron Garden, in southeast Portland, Oregon, in 2018

There is a large population of crows in the American city of Portland, Oregon. Hannah Seibold of the Portland Tribune has called the crows "one of Portland's most famous wild residents". The Portland Crow Roost is a project to count and document the roosting locations of the local crow population.

According to BBC Wildlife, Portland's "crow problems" began in 2014. While the use of bird poison on public property has been banned since 2019, some dead crows have been found with the neurotoxin Avitrol in their system. The city has a small team of falconers who use hawks to move crows out of a focused 72-block radius. In 2026, crows attacked employees at Legacy Emanuel. Torn up lawns in Portland have also been attributed to crows.

== Behavior and population size ==
While some of the birds are migratory, most are residents of the region. According to Bird Alliance of Oregon, crows gather along the Willamette River because there are "fewer conflicts". There are also fewer predators in downtown Portland. The crow population in Portland can reach as high as 15,000 to 23,000. The population has increased in the last decade.

There is a seasonal pattern to the crow roosting. During the fall season (August to October), crows return to the city for "pre-roost". Peak urban roosting takes places during the winter season (November to February). There is a population decrease during the spring season (March and April), before peak breeding occurs during the summer season (May to July).

== Culture ==
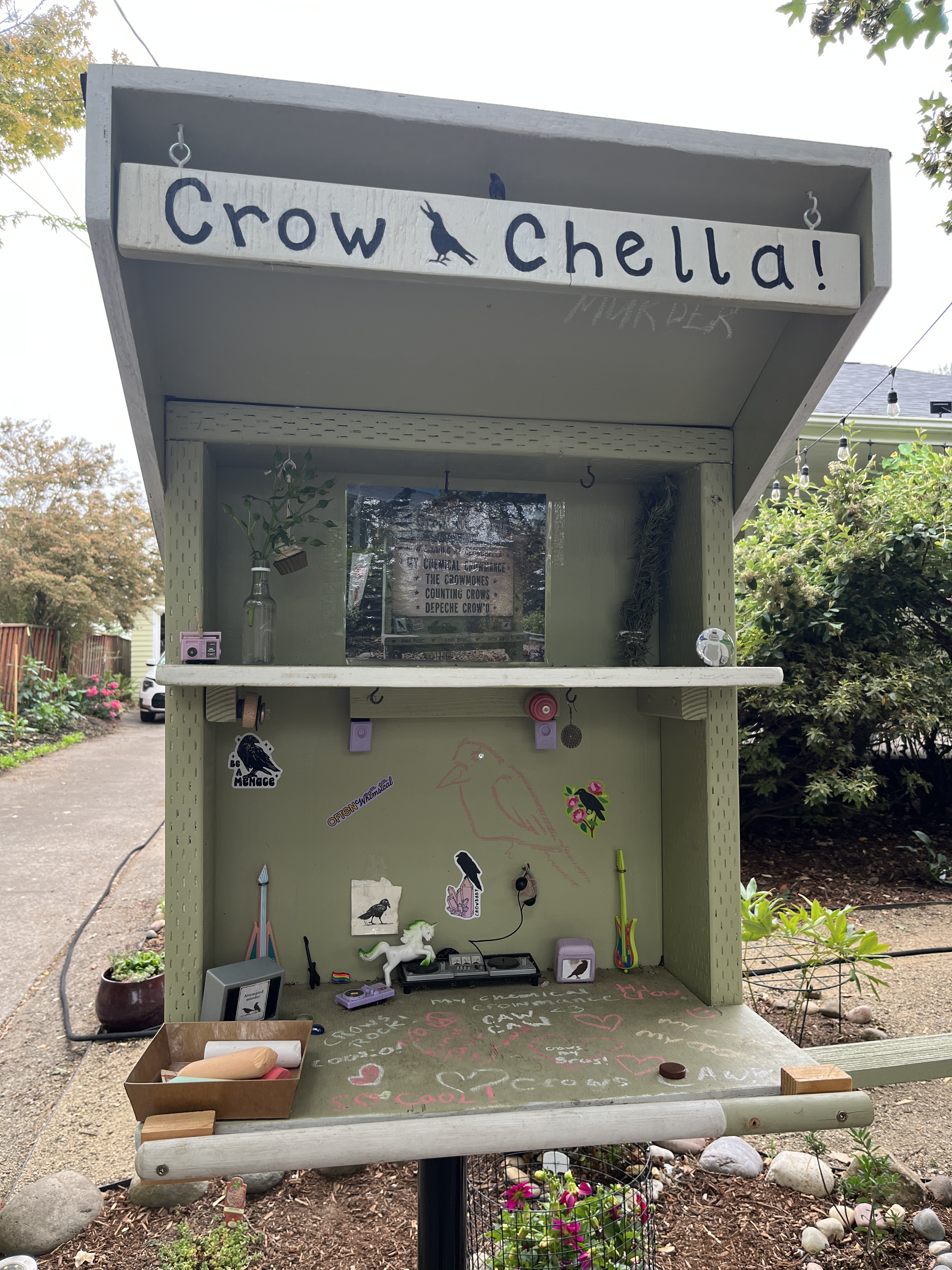
PDX Sidewalk Joy installation dedicated to crows, 2026

Portland's crows are depicted in the 2026 film Wildwood; the film inspired the temporary art installation Wildwood: Follow the Crows, which saw statues of crows placed throughout the city in 2026.

In 2026, the Peace House in the Irvington neighborhood was converted into a haunted attraction called "Crow Manor". Proceeds from the attraction benefited Doernbecher Children's Hospital.

== See also ==
- Fauna of Oregon
  - List of birds of Oregon
