= Wildwood: Follow the Crows =

Temporary art installation in Portland, Oregon, U.S.

- Year: 7 August 2026
- Completion date: 31 October 2026
- Medium: Fiberglass and steel sculpture
- Subject: Crows
- Location: Portland, Oregon, U.S.

Wildwood: Follow the Crows was a temporary art trail installed in Portland, Oregon, on August 7, 2026. Similar to the 2024 installation Coraline's Curious Cat Trail, Wildwood: Follow the Crows was a collaboration between Laika (the studio behind the stop-motion animated film Wildwood), Oregon Health and Science University's Doernbecher Children's Hospital, Wild in Art, the Portland Metro Chamber, and Downtown Portland Clean and Safe, and was supported by the Visit Downtown Campaign.

The sculptures remained installed until October 31, 2026, then were auctioned off with proceeds benefitting Doernbecher. The call for designs yielded 214 submissions. The crows were 6 feet (1.8 m) tall and were completed by August 2026. Artists painted the fiberglass statues in a downtown office space that previously housed Start Making a Reader Today. The work space was called the "Crow's Nest" for the Wildwood project. The art trail had a corresponding app, digital and physical maps, a Spotify playlist, and a website. A grand opening was held at St. Johns Library on August 7.

== Locations and statues ==
A Crow of a Different Color (left) by Mike Bennett and Paul Birdyan (right) by Michael Buchayano at Darcelle XV Plaza

The statues were made of steel and fiberglass. Local and regional artists were "inspired by Portland's people, places and stories", according to KOIN. 23 of the sculptures were installed in the city center, and 7 were installed elsewhere in Portland. The works were installed in business districts and parks, as well as along Forest Park's Wildwood Trail. Three of the statues formed a "Wildwood sequence" to connect Bird Alliance of Oregon, the International Rose Test Garden, and Pittock Mansion. All 30 statues appeared at Darcelle XV Plaza the weekend of October 30 to November 1, 2026.

Some of the sculptures gathered at Darcelle XV Plaza

Mike Bennett, Lizzie Keenan, Reuben Lancaster, and Sam Warford were among the 30 artists selected to participate. Bennett's sculpture A Crow of a Different Color was installed outside Lincoln High School. Bennett hosted a crow-painting workshop in September 2026. Carson Ellis, who illustrated for the Wildwood novel series, designed a map for the statue installed at the St. Johns Library and attended the grand opening. Lil Hobbit Cosmonaut's sculpture was installed at Keller Fountain Park. Lizzie Keenan's statue Sir Timber Cawthorne was installed at the International Rose Test Garden and Olivia Mount's work Emergence was displayed at Salmon Street Springs in Tom McCall Waterfront Park. Matt Jones, also known as Freaky Footwear, was also selected for the project. His sculpture was installed at Jamison Square. Sam Warford, aged 19, was the youngest artist selected to participate.

Michael Buchayano's statue Paul Birdyan, which resembles Paul Bunyon, was installed near Pride Plaza. The bird has a red-and-white checkered pattern, as well as blue and black parts. The work was vandalized by August 11, with black spraypaint on the coat and blue paint on the beak. The artist was not upset and later repaired the piece. Downtown Portland Clean & Safe had "sidewalk ambassadors" to check on the statues regularly.

Maya McDarragh's statue, called Sakura Hanami, was installed outside Portland City Hall. Mayor Keith Wilson advocated for the installation and permitting with the Portland Bureau of Transportation, Portland Parks & Recreation, and Facilities Services was facilitated by the Public Environment Management Office.

== See also ==
- 2026 in art
- Crows in Portland, Oregon
- Cultural depictions of ravens
