= Coraline's Curious Cat Trail =

Temporary art installation in Portland, Oregon, U.S.

- Year: 2024
- Medium: Fiberglass sculpture
- Location: Portland, Oregon, U.S.

Coraline's Curious Cat Trail was a temporary art installation in Portland, Oregon, United States. The series featured 31 fiberglass statues of cats decorated by various artists, inspired by the 2009 animated film Coraline, which were installed across the city during August 2 – October 13, 2024. Following public display, the sculptures were auctioned off, with proceeds benefiting Oregon Health & Science University's Doernbecher Children's Hospital. The project was a collaborative effort by the hospital, Laika (the Hillsboro-based production company behind Coraline), Downtown Portland Clean and Safe, Visit Downtown, and art installation producer Wild in Art. The final designs were selected from 80 submissions. Sponsors included The Oregonian and Wieden+Kennedy.

== Description ==
Hero Sculpture by Katy Hughes and Rosie Chambers was inspired by the film's character Other Mother.

Keep Portland Weird by Celeste Potgieter on display at Director Park

Described as an "interactive art trail", Coraline's Curious Cat Trail was a temporary art installation in Portland, Oregon. It featured 31 cat statues inspired by the feline character Cat in the 2009 animated film Coraline, which is based on the 2002 novella of the same name by Neil Gaiman and was the first feature film produced by Hillsboro-based Laika, LLC. Various artists hand-painted and otherwise decorated the approximately 6-foot (1.8 m) tall fiberglass sculptures, and each was unique. The statues were on public display for ten weeks (August 2 – October 13, 2024), after which they were sold at auction with proceeds benefiting Oregon Health & Science University's (OHSU) Doernbecher Children's Hospital. Coraline's Curious Cat Trail also included an app with a map of the sculptures and other features, as well as a custom website and playlist on Spotify. In addition to being a fundraiser, the project was part of an effort to revitalize downtown Portland, according to Portland Metro Chamber.

=== Locations and statues ===
The statues were installed throughout Portland, including at the International Rose Test Garden in Washington Park and at Pittock Mansion in the Tualatin Mountains. In downtown Portland, sculptures were installed at City Hall, Director Park, Jamison Square, the North Park Blocks, Pioneer Courthouse Square, Pioneer Place, the Portland Art Museum, Portland Saturday Market, Skidmore Fountain, Tom McCall Waterfront Park (including Salmon Street Springs), and the World Trade Center. Artworks were also installed outside the Oregon Museum of Science and Industry and at Pride Plaza outside the Crystal Ballroom.

A statue designed by Katy Hughes, a lead scenic painter at Laika, and Rosie Chambers, a young patient at Doernbecher, depicted a blue cat with a pink nose and ears, as well as eyes with pink roses and small black spots inspired by the film's character, Other Mother. It was unveiled outside OHSU South Waterfront. Artist Celeste Potgieter painted two statues. One featured a "fanciful" map depicting Oregon landmarks such as Cannon Beach, the Columbia River Gorge, Crater Lake, and the Oregon Dunes. The other, called Keep Portland Weird, after the slogan "Keep Portland weird", had blue zebra stripes, glitter, a unicorn hat, local imagery, and a depiction of Bigfoot. Another artist, Rae Sheridan, sculpted the Jean-Michel Basquiat-inspired Infinity Kitty, which had large blue and purple eyes. Sheridan was motivated by giving others "a sense of hope". Another cat was designed by Arielle Wilkins, a senior designer at the advertising agency and project sponsor Wieden+Kennedy. Her statue was decorated with hundreds of colorful resin flowers. Wilkins said she was motivated to "show the vibrancy" and "the sparkle of Portland".

== History and impact ==
Coraline's Curious Cat Trail was a collaborative effort by Doernbecher Children's Hospital, Laika, Downtown Portland Clean and Safe, Visit Downtown, and the art installation producer Wild in Art. The project coincided with the fifteenth anniversary of the release of Coraline. It also marked the first art trail installation in the U.S. for Wild in Art, which is based in the United Kingdom.

In February 2024, project collaborators hosted a countdown event. Actress Teri Hatcher, who voiced the Coraline characters Mother, Other Mother, and The Beldam, attended the event and said the project brought people together. A call for artists issued in March 2024 resulted in 80 design submissions. Project sponsors, which included The Oregonian / OregonLive.com and Wieden+Kennedy, helped select the final designs. The project's launch event was held at a plaza outside OHSU South Waterfront on August 2, 2024. Artists, sponsors, and other supporters of the project were in attendance. The statue by Hughes and Chambers was unveiled at the event.

Keep Portland Weird, which was installed at Tom McCall Waterfront Park near Portland Saturday Market, was reported missing in September. It was later confirmed to have been removed on purpose by an employee of Portland Parks & Recreation, who thought the sculpture was not securely attached to the base. Organizers of the event were not aware of the temporary removal and filed a police report. The statue was quickly located and re-installed.

All 31 statues were displayed at Director Park on the weekend of October 12–13, ahead of the October 30 auction at the Judy Kafoury Center for Youth Arts. The auction raised $324,500 for Doernbecher Children's Hospital. Coraline's Curious Cat Trail drew approximately 135,000–147,000 visitors and had an estimated positive economic impact of $4 million for the city. Approximately 10,000 people attended the final weekend, when the statues were collected at Director Park.

== See also ==
- Cultural depictions of cats
- Fathom (art installation), another temporary art installation in Portland
- Wildwood: Follow the Crows (2026)
