= Wish trees in Portland, Oregon =

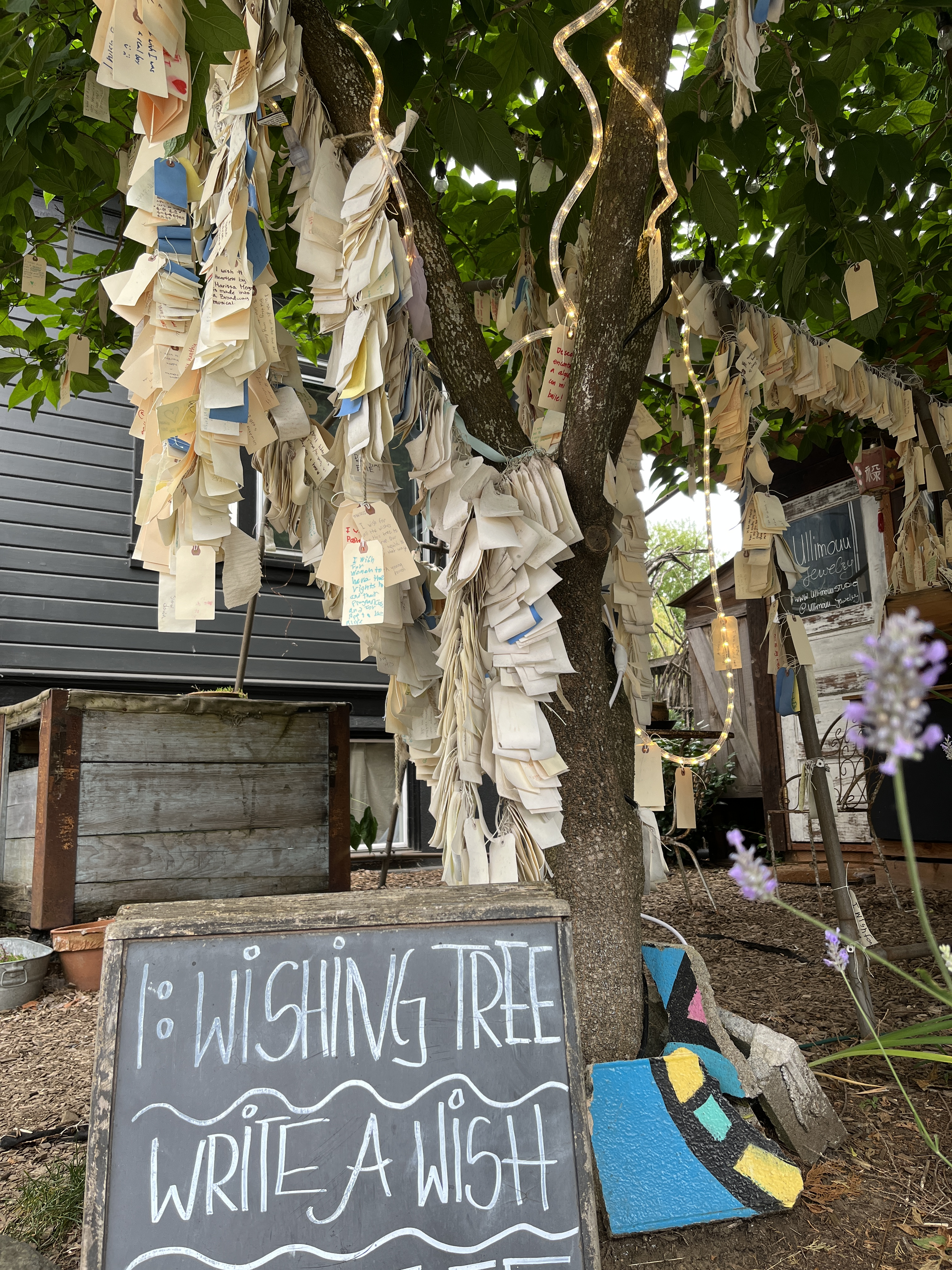
A wish tree in north Portland, Oregon, in 2022

The American city of Portland, Oregon has seen many wish trees (also known as wishing trees), as well as variants.

== Wish trees ==
Portland's "original" wish tree is at the intersection of Morris Street and 7th Avenue in northeast Portland. The horse chestnut (Aesculus hippocastanum), sometimes called "Wishing Tree I", has been used as a wish tree since 2013. Inspired by a San Francisco-based blog, Nicole Helprin and her two children attached wishes to the tree before going on a vacation. The family returned to find many additional wishes had been left by others. Since November 2014, the site has offered instructions on a wooden clipboard for people to write on blank tags and tie them to the tree. Markers and manila shipping labels are available on site. People have left wishes ranging from a pony to more time to play video games to world peace. Wishes in 2014 included, "I am wishing for golden threads and a year full of crepes", and "I wish for everlasting love". Hundreds of wishes are often attached to the wish tree, which has inspired others in the city.

There is a wish tree on North Williams Avenue between Northeast Shaver and Mason Streets. According to Atlas Obscura, "People of all ages scribble out desires, both public and private, and hang the tags on the tree in hopes that some greater power will fulfill them. But the majority ... seem to do with love, wishing for new love or longevity in the love they have. All the wishes are anonymous, making it easy to write something down and walk away."

Sarah Bott began hanging wishes on a birch tree at her Woodlawn Guest House on Dekum Street in northeast Portland in 2014. Yoko Ono's Wish Tree visited Portland Japanese Garden in 2024.

== Variants ==
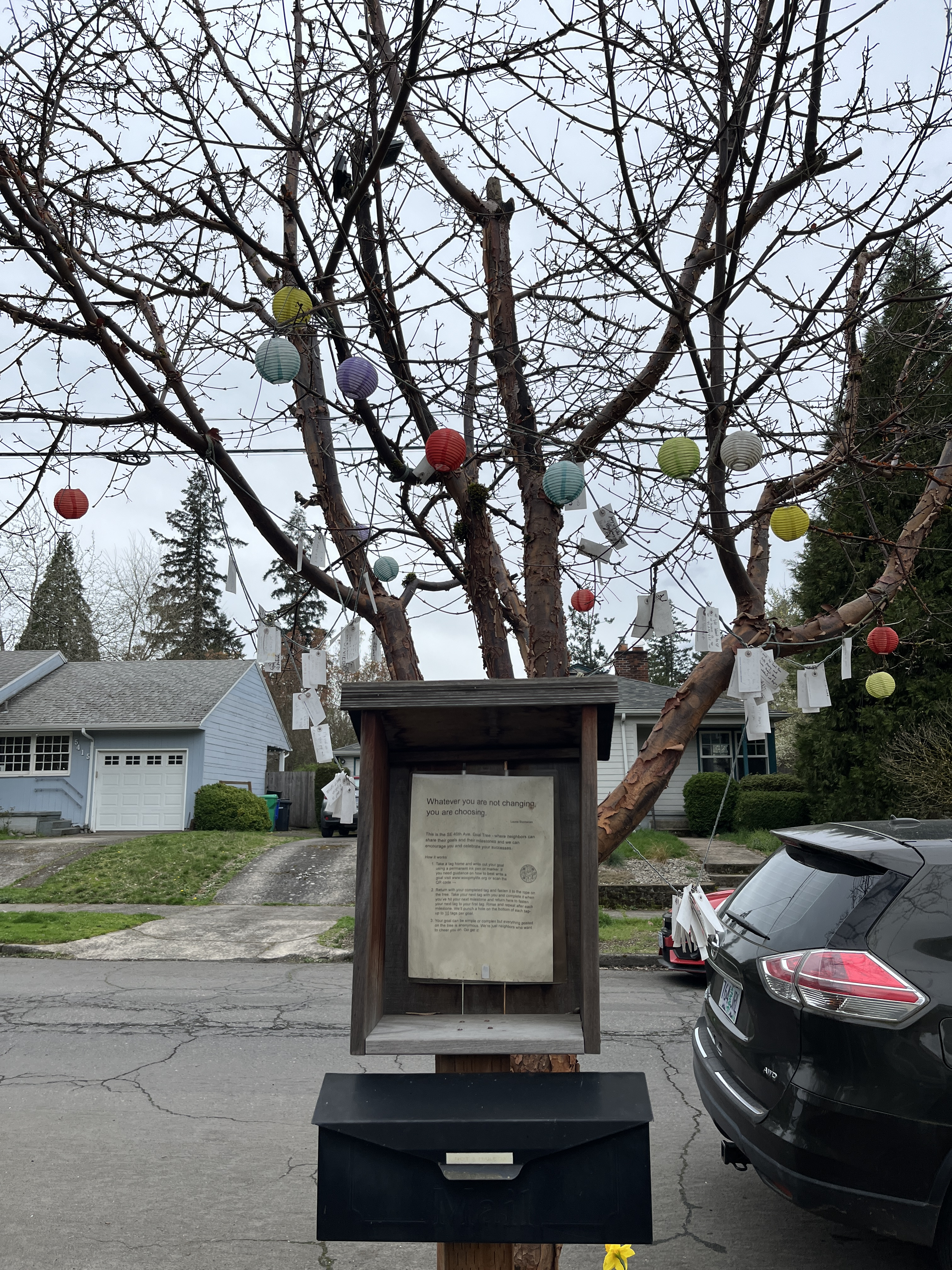
The Goal Tree (pictured in 2025) in southeast Portland, Oregon is part of the PDX Sidewalk Joy project.

Portland has also seen variants of wish trees. In southwest Portland in 2020, there was a "gratitude tree" intended for giving thanks instead of making wishes. A variant sometimes called "Wishing Tree II" is installed at the intersection of Northeast 20th Avenue and Fremont Street. The "tree" is actually a metal rack measuring 5 feet by 6 feet.

== See also ==
- Capitol Hill Wishing Tree, Seattle
- Culture of Portland, Oregon
