= Dinolandia =

Art project and pop-up museum in Portland, Oregon, U.S.

- The exhibit's logo
- Artist: Mike Bennett
- Year: 2022
- Medium: Plywood; paint
- Subject: Dinosaurs
- Location: Portland, Oregon, United States; 45.5186°N 122.6803°W

Dinolandia was a dinosaur art project and pop-up museum by American visual artist Mike Bennett. It operated in a former department store in Portland, Oregon's Fox Tower, from May 31 to September 10, 2022. The exhibit featured themed displays with dozens of plywood cutouts depicting various dinosaur species in a prehistoric forest setting. Dinolandia also had works by other artists, including a mural depicting the Columbia River and Mount Hood and an installation depicting hatching dinosaur eggs. The exhibit was designed to educate visitors about dinosaurs and the time period in which they lived. It included storytelling elements, interactive videos, and an original soundtrack. Dinolandia garnered a positive reception for appealing to a wide age range and for bringing art to an unused downtown retail space.

== Description ==
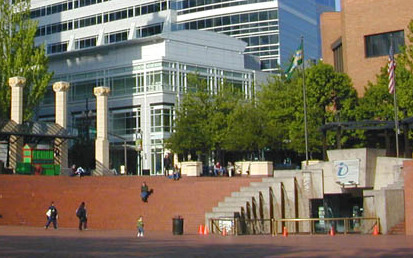
Dinolandia operated in the Fox Tower across from downtown Portland's Pioneer Courthouse Square (pictured in 2004)

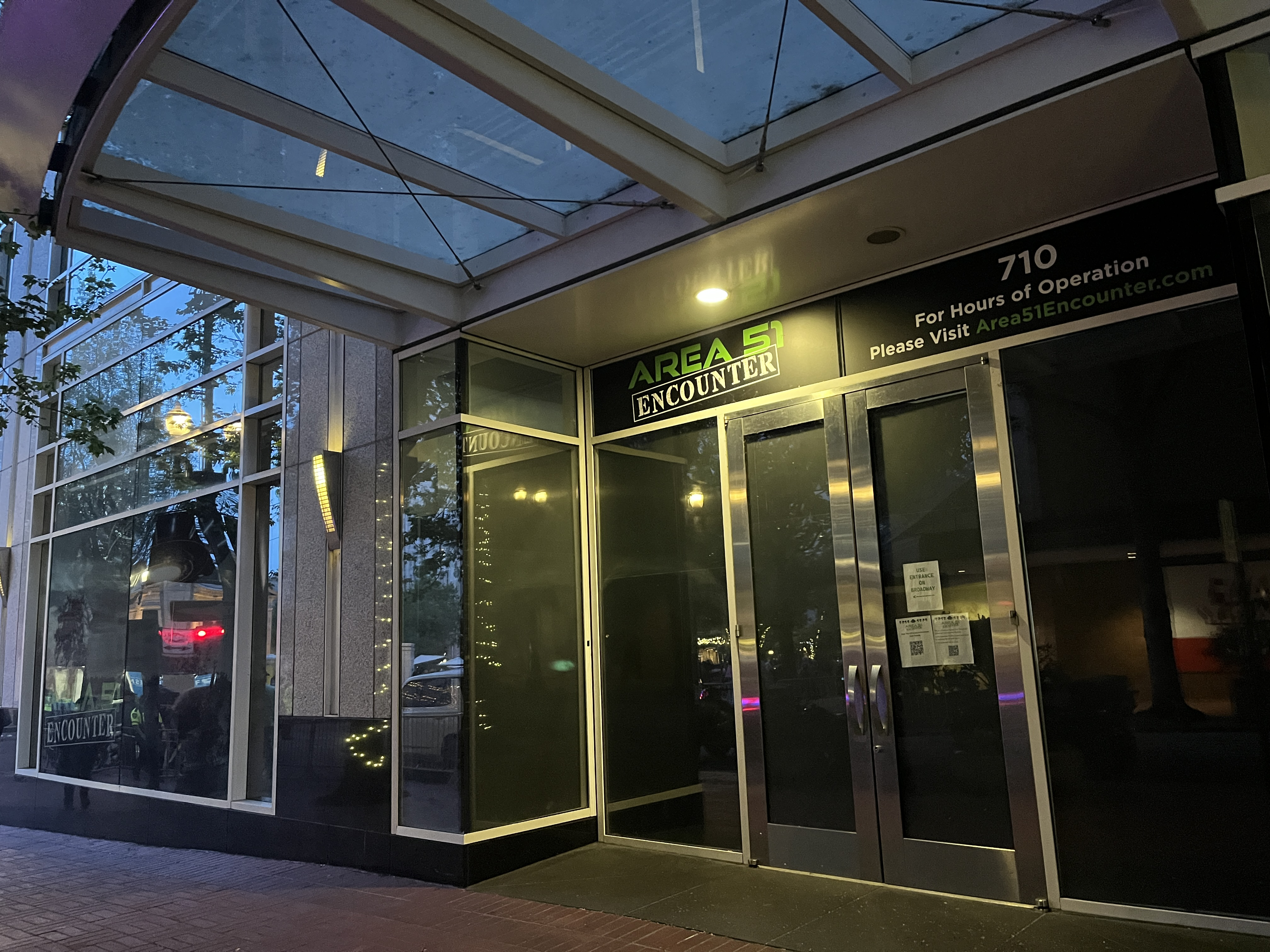
Exterior of the Fox Tower, which housed Dinolandia, with signage for Area 51 Encounter in 2025

Dinolandia was a dinosaur art project and interactive pop-up museum by American artist Mike Bennett. It operated in a two-story, 22,000-square-foot (0.20 ha) space that previously housed a department store (Banana Republic) on Southwest Yamhill Street in downtown Portland's Fox Tower, across from Pioneer Courthouse Square. Admission was $5, but was free for children eight or younger. Visitors followed a designated one-way route and were required to wear face masks because of the COVID-19 pandemic. There was also a gift shop.

=== Displays and storytelling ===
Dinolandia had approximately 1,000 cutouts in Bennett's typical style, including 67 painted dinosaur figures made of reclaimed plywood, representing approximately 50 species. KBOO said the exhibit was "full of quirky, cute and often drooling wooden dinosaurs". Among the artwork were a Tyrannosaurus, multiple Velociraptor, two Stegosaurus, a purple-and-lavender-colored Albertosaurus, and an armored Ankylosaurus. The cartoon reptiles were displayed in a "psychedelic-tinted prehistoric forest", according to Oregon Public Broadcasting (OPB). The Albertosaurus and the Tyrannosaurus were the two tallest figures, each measuring 15 feet (4.6 m) tall.

One display, called Professor Rex's Collection Room, had black-and-white cartoon fossils commemorating the natural history museums exhibitions visited by Bennett as a child. The Collection Room was connected to the second floor via an elevator decorated as a time machine, which arrived in a room with a Stegosaurus in a green and brightly lit forest. Dinolandia also featured works by other artists. A mural of a prehistoric Columbia River and Mount Hood was painted by Julia Hunkler in a way that makes the river appear to spill from the wall and down one of the exhibit's hallways. Another display, called Cretaceous Creations, featured dinosaur-themed works by eight artists in spaces formerly used as changing rooms. One installation by Chase Castro depicted hatching dinosaur eggs and was made from bamboo, feathers, polymer clay, parts of stuffed toys, styrofoam, and other materials. Another display was themed as an underwater cave. The Art Closet encouraged children to create new artworks for display. The Artist Hallway had art by Brian Cook and other community members. Among Dinolandia's final displays along the route was one depicting the heads and necks of seven Brachiosaurus, painted in rainbow colors and installed over a curved staircase.

Bennett sought to make the exhibit both entertaining and educational from a paleontological perspective. It featured facts and timelines about dinosaurs and when they lived, as well as storytelling that incorporated time travel themes. Dinolandia had an original soundtrack and a series of interactive videos involving a mad scientist character and a time machine in need of repair. There were also allusions to a major dinosaur film franchise and other popular culture references. Bennett tried to make the exhibit as sustainable as possible.

== History ==
Bennett announced plans for the exhibit in March 2022. Small signs announcing Dinolandia were placed in the building's windows. On social media, Bennett posted a video of him mixing paint, with a cartoon Stegosaurus and Triceratops in the background. He was inspired by a dinosaur museum he had visited during a road trip with his wife.

Dinolandia was open from May 31, 2022 to September 10, 2022. Thirty-three friends, artists, and volunteers helped Bennett paint, install, and illuminate the dinosaur figures and other displays, which were made with approximately 420 sheets of donated plywood and 120 gallons of recycled paint. It took five people to assemble the Albertosaurus. The mural Bennett commissioned from Hunkler took her two days to complete. Bennett said the Brachiosaurus cutouts were the last installations to be made and "posed a challenge to install and translate from conception to creation", according to OPB. Curator and sculptor Lana Crooks, who helped Bennett on Dinolandia, later collaborated with him on his coffee shop with a similar "immersive art display" called Wonderwood. Bennett's business partner Teddy Albertson also collaborated on the project; the duo previously worked together on other pop-ups in Portland and would later relocate Mike Bennett Studios downtown and launch Portland Aquarium.

== Reception ==
Laurel Reed Pavic of Oregon ArtsWatch called Dinolandia an "experiment with art in abandoned retail real estate" and said the exhibit "makes the case that filling abandoned retail spaces with art exhibitions is a good idea, one that can inject energy into flagging downtown sectors". Pavic also described Dinolandia as a "joy" and opined: "The exhibit is brightly colored, entertaining, and educational. Bennett's enthusiasm for the project and for creating an immersive space that delights the viewer is evident throughout." Meg Asby of PDX Parent said the exhibit appealed to a wide age range and wrote: "Younger children will marvel at the bright colors, cheerful dinosaurs and moving lights. Older kids will love reading about the dinosaurs and trying to match the names to their giant cutouts. Adults and kids alike will chuckle at the descriptions." Asby characterized Dinolandia as a "joy-filled experience" and quipped, "it's so much better than a Banana Republic".

Kat Leon of the Portland State Vanguard, a student publication at Portland State University, praised the exhibit for eliciting nostalgia and for its inclusive atmosphere. Leon said Dinolandia "appeals to the inner child in its visitors" and wrote: "The safety and inclusivity within the museum were evident. From requiring and providing masks for all guests, to the bathrooms being gender-neutral, to pronoun pins supplied to all the employees—as a non-binary, queer human, this place felt like one of the most welcoming and safe spaces I have stepped into in a very long time." Leon also opined:

Dinolandia provides that space to create, be inspired and embrace joy and happiness in a moment where we could all use a bit more of that... This happiness is not exclusively limited to children—adults especially can receive something from this experience. We can go back in time. We can become young again and embrace the parts of us that desire fun, play and joy. As adults, we need to dust off our childlike imagination more often, slow down and embrace the joy, even if it sometimes feels impossible.

Suzette Smith of the Portland Mercury said Dinolandia and Bennett's pop-up Crypto-Zoo in north Portland's St. Johns neighborhood were "fun for youths and adults alike" and "a sign of Portland's regrowth from the tangles of corporate doom". In a 2023 article about Portland's "weirdness", Daniel Scheffler of the music magazine Spin said of Dinolandia: "Yeah, that's weird — it's not something you might expect, wouldn't seem to be precisely commercial, and that's perfect."

== See also ==
- 2022 in art
- Cultural depictions of dinosaurs
- List of museums in Portland, Oregon
- Stegosaurus in popular culture
- Tyrannosaurus in popular culture
