= Portland Aquarium (art installation) =

2025 exhibit by American artist Mike Bennett in Portland, Oregon, U.S.

- The installation's logo
- Artist: Mike Bennett
- Year: 2025
- Subject: Marine life
- Location: Portland, Oregon, U.S.; 45.5200°N 122.6795°W
- Website: mikebennettstudios.com/portland-aquarium

Portland Aquarium was an art installation by American artist Mike Bennett, established in Portland, Oregon, on June 6, 2025. The educational and immersive exhibit opened at Southwest Alder and Broadway in downtown Portland in collaboration with the nonprofit organization Elakha Alliance and Big Fish Lab. Portland Aquarium featured approximately 100 cartoon paintings of various sea animals on plywood, some of which were animated. Visitors were provided a field guide developed by a marine biologist, which also had illustrations of marine life by Bennett, and navigated a fictional environment with a storyline and music provided by composer RAC (André Allen Anjos). The exhibit closed permanently on October 4, 2026.

== Description ==
Mike Bennett's educational and immersive art installation Portland Aquarium operated in a 5,000-square-foot space at the intersection of Southwest Alder Street and Broadway in downtown Portland. Racket Magazine called the exhibit a "fantastical undersea journey" and described the fictional Bennett's Bay as a world "with oversized sea creatures, vibrant coral-scapes, animated tide pools" and "more interactive storytelling than your average kids' cartoon". Visitors received a 24-page field guide called the Explorer Compendium that was developed by marine biologist Chanel Hason to accompany the exhibit. Portland Aquarium also featured works by composer RAC (André Allen Anjos) and a scavenger hunt.

Cartoons were painted on the exhibit's exterior. Once inside, visitors entered the fictional research station Cascadia Marine Lab and met the character Wade C. Bennett, a professor who was portrayed by Mike Bennett. The exhibit's storyline had guests work as field observers to identify species in six biomes using the provided field guides and assist Wade C. Bennett, who was stranded at the bottom of the ocean after attempting to photograph a giant squid. The field guide had facts as well as cartoon illustrations by Mike Bennett. RAC's soundtrack featured unique music for each biome. Portland Aquarium was Bennett's first project to include both animation and painted floors. General admission was $14; entry was $10 for children aged 2 to 12 and no cost for children under the age of 2.

=== Visuals ===
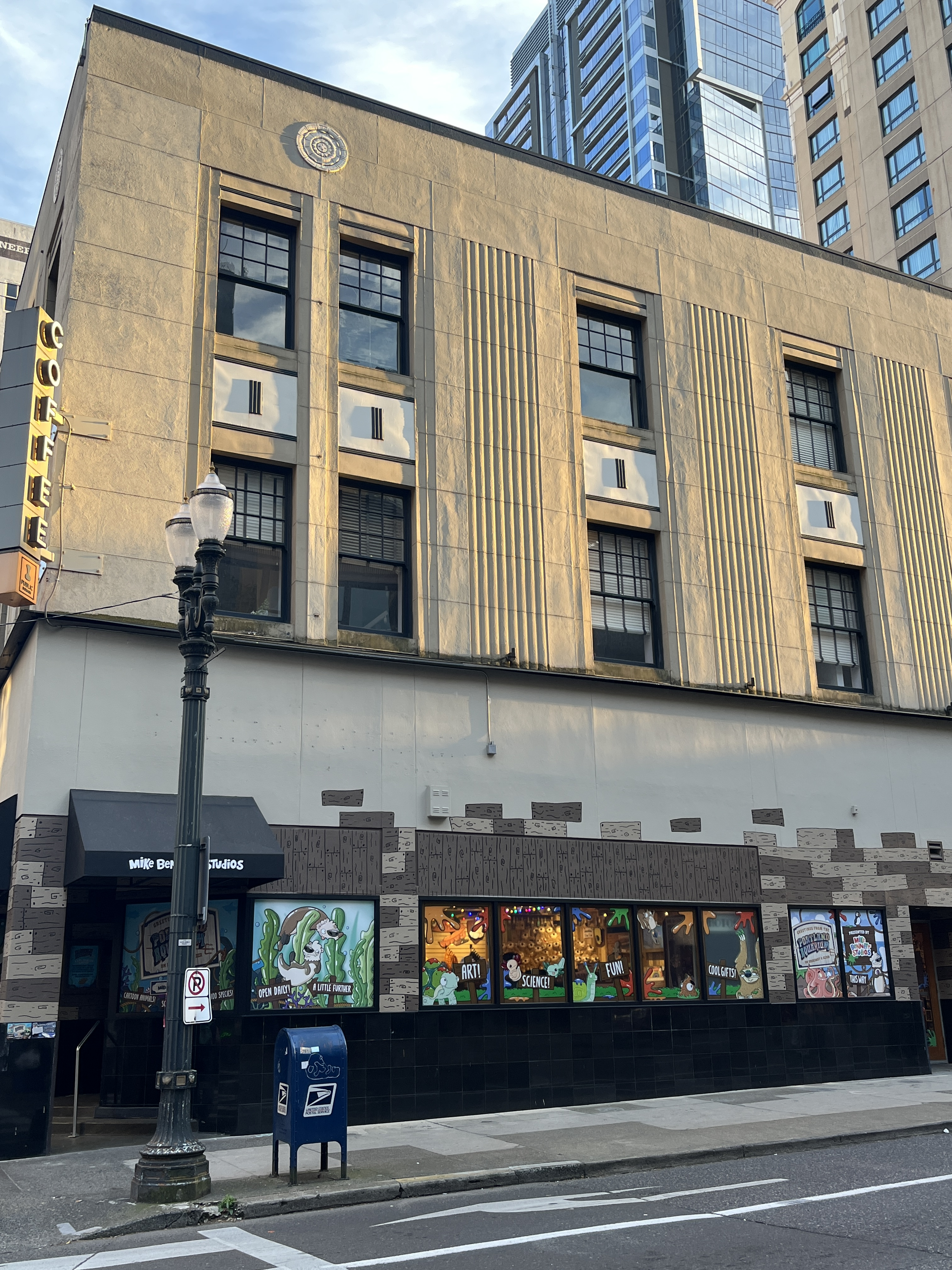
May 2025 photograph of the building at the intersection of Southwest Alder and Broadway with window displays by Mike Bennett Studios; previously, the building housed Public Domain Coffee

The exhibit featured approximately 100 cartoon paintings of marine species, including 20-foot-long whales, bubblegum pink-colored blobfish, deep-sea fish, great white sharks, gulls, jellyfish, and sea otters. Some artworks were hand-painted, and others were digitally printed on plywood. The gulls, which had flapping wings, were among animated artworks. There was also a missing goldfish named Gilly in each biome. Among the biomes were Open Ocean, which focused on some of the ocean's largest animals, and the Wreck, which highlighted deep-sea carnivores and other animals. Bennett created one part of the exhibit, a blue wall with red coral, based on a book about the ocean that he read to his daughter.

== History ==
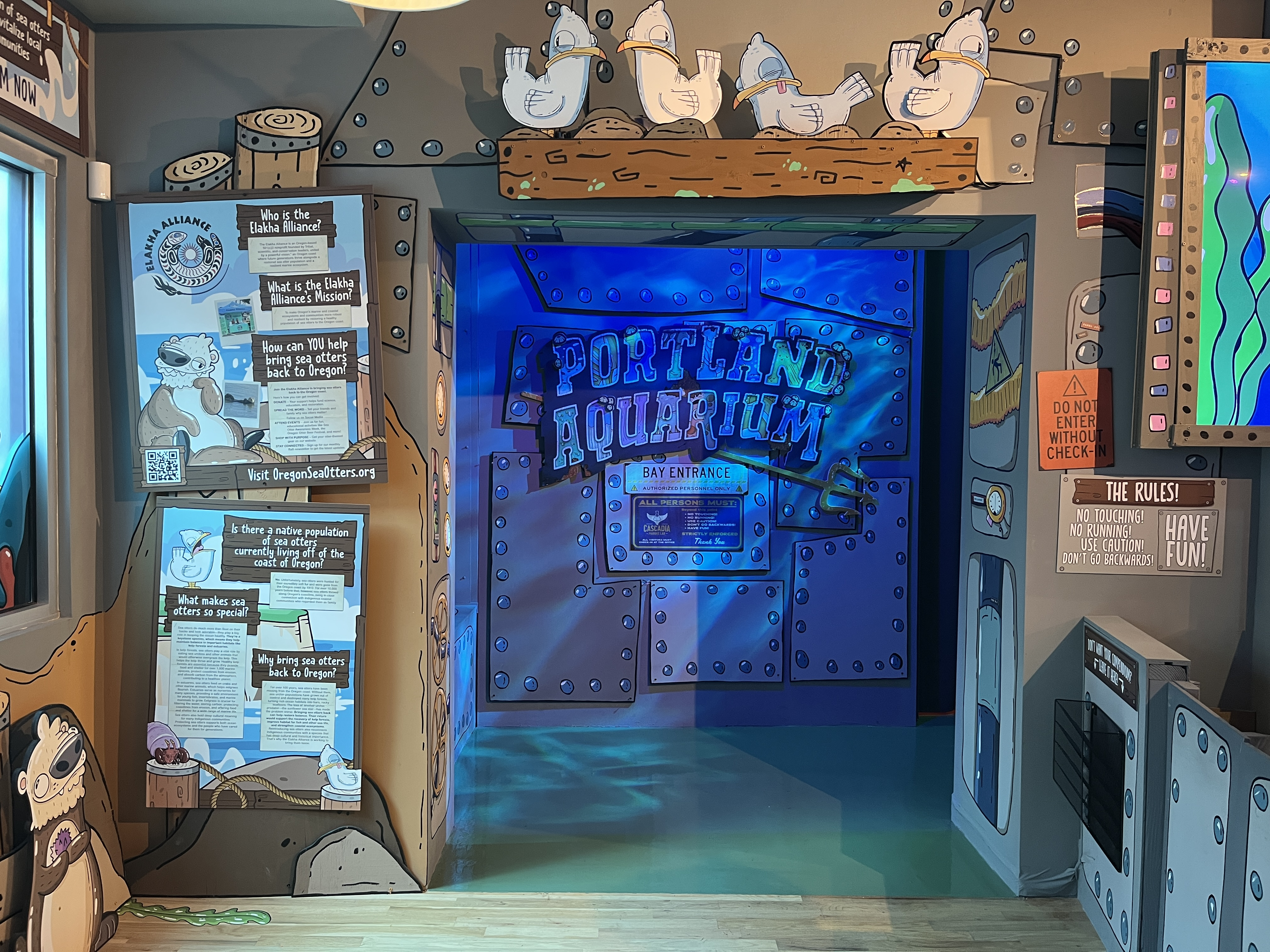
Entrance to the exhibit from the lobby

In March 2025, Willamette Week described Bennett's plans to open an "immersive educational play space for families" where Public Domain Coffee had operated a coffee shop. Bennett had recently signed a lease for the space and said the site would host "half-science, half-arts/DIY projects" and a gift shop with artworks from his various projects. The Portland Business Journal also reported on Mike Bennett Studios' planned relocation to the building that housed Public Domain and a shop operated by Sprint Corporation. The newspaper said the studio would have an "arts-forward education space" offering a "rotating educational, immersive art experience" and a gift shop.

Bennett and his business partner Teddy Albertson had been searching for a permanent space in downtown Portland since before the COVID-19 pandemic. The duo had also collaborated on other pop-up installations including Dinolandia (2022). The Portland Business Journal said the studio's move was an effort to revitalize downtown Portland. Bennett had completed approximately 50 artworks for the first exhibit at the new location by March 2025. He planned to reveal the project's theme in April and open to the public in June. Portland Aquarium opened on June 6, 2025, in a space that had been vacant for approximately five years. Previously, Bennett had installed A, B, Sea, an art exhibit featuring marine life, outside his home in 2021. A, B, Sea sought to teach children about the alphabet and the ocean during the pandemic. It was attended by approximately 1,000 people and inspired Bennett to install art in public spaces.

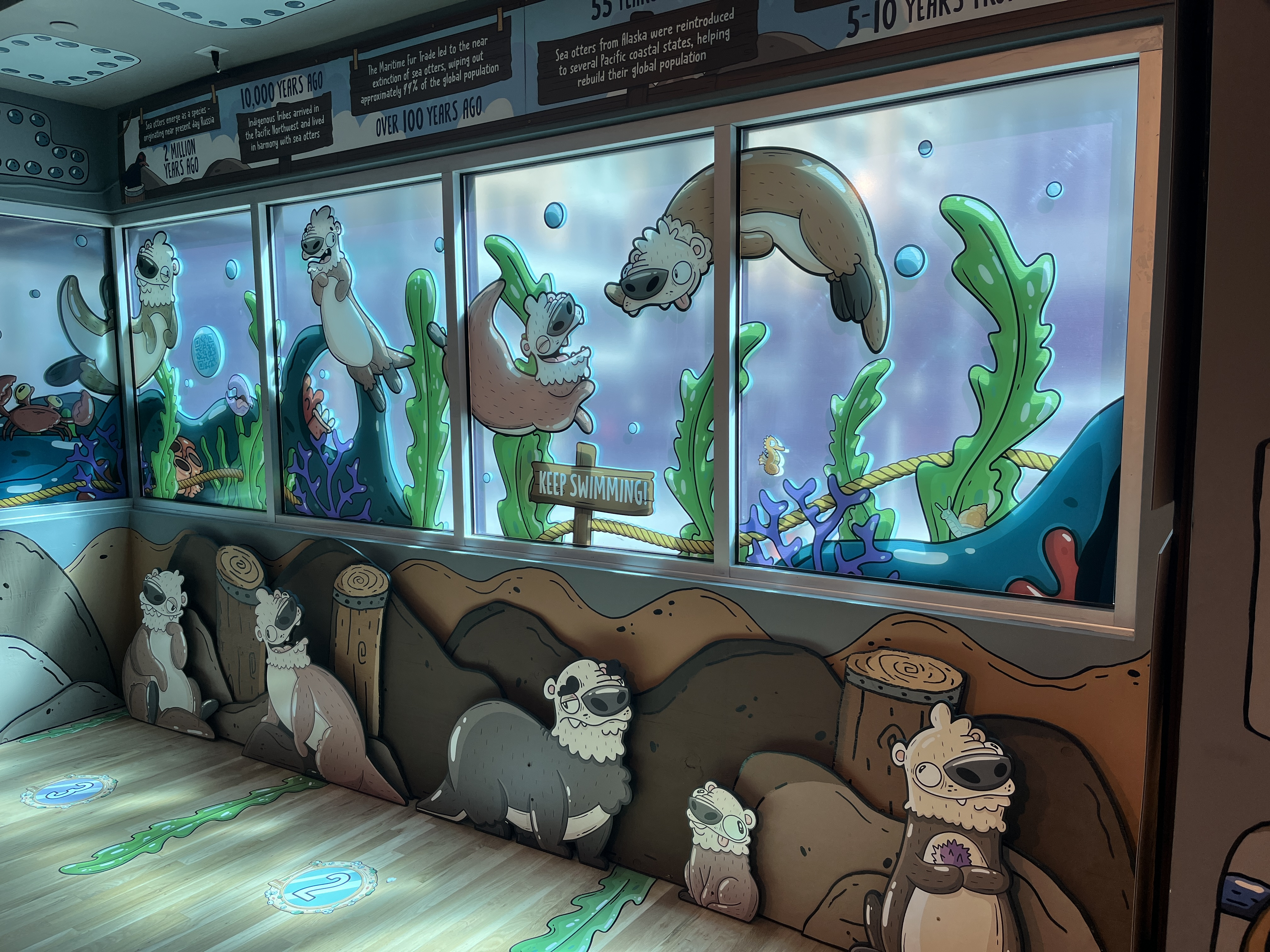
The interior of the lobby

For Portland Aquarium, Bennett collaborated with the local nonprofit organization Elakha Alliance (EA), which sought to reintroduce sea otters to the Oregon Coast, and Big Fish Lab to develop and install the exhibit over four months. Hason, a marine biologist for EA, directed Bennett's art "to more accurately represent the animals, while still giving him leeway to be playful", according to the Portland Tribune. Volunteers recruited on social media assisted Bennett by painting floors and building coral reefs, and some of the volunteers became paid staff. According to KPTV, he chose the location because "Bennett says it's important to have art downtown and he's happy to be the person to bring it here".

The local company Imaginary Planet helped create the animations. For the exhibit's opening weekend, a live shark dissection was hosted in the lobby, as Bennett hoped this would attract families to downtown as well as school groups. Later in the year, Portland Aquarium hosted an event to raise funds for Elakha Alliance. The collaboration featured artworks by Bennett and Kate's Ice Cream's launch of the flavor Ottie's Oreo, which was inspired by the artist's otter character. In late December 2025 and early January 2026, members of the public were invited to participate in the 'Gilly the Goldfish Scavenger Hunt'. Participants could pick up scavenger hunt sheets at Bennett's Snow Day Village installation at Director Park to find Gilly, who had "escaped" from the aquarium. In June 2026, Portland Aquarium offered half-price on admission with proof of same-day receipt from a local business.

In July 2026, Bennett announced that Portland Aquarium would close on October 4. He used the space to install Mike Bennett's Dead Media: Holiday Special, a "holiday edition" of Dead Media Video Rentals, which was a haunted house-themed installation at Mike Bennett Studios in Northeast Portland's Irvington neighborhood. According to the Portland Tribune, the installation "blends the charm of a vintage VHS rental store with elements of Bennett's popular Snow Day Village" and has "familiar characters, playful details and a touch of spooky humor". The installation opened on November 13, 2026.

== Reception ==
The interior of the gift shop

Lizzy Acker of The Oregonian said Portland Aquarium was "arguably [Bennett's] best" project to date, as well as his "most polished and most immersive work yet". She wrote that he used cartoon creatures and "supercharge[d] it", adding that "[it was] working so well that it [felt] a little bit like Disneyland". Acker appreciated the animated components and the meditative mood, writing about its sense of calm induced by the sights and sounds of the exhibit's habitats. She also opined that it was "just what Portland [needed]", calling it "weirder, sillier, and better" than previously housed businesses. Meg Asby of PDX Parent called the field guide "fun and engaging", as well as "a standout piece on its own". She wrote, "Adults and kids alike will totally geek out over it. I cannot recommend it enough." Racket Magazine described the cartoon illustrations in the field guides as "delightfully weird" and said of the exhibit:

As adults, making friends is harder than it used to be. But at Bennett's installations, the barriers drop. Conversations start. Kids teach their parents about cassowaries. Grown-ups laugh at bad jokes hidden on a wall. People slow down and just begin to absorb the world around them. Whether you're a kid, a kid-at-heart, or just someone in desperate need of a serotonin boost, this underwater world is the kind of place Portland didn't know it needed — but Mike Bennett absolutely knew we deserved.

== See also ==
- 2025 in art
- Culture of Portland, Oregon
- Marine art
