= Robot Alley =

Art installation in Portland, Oregon

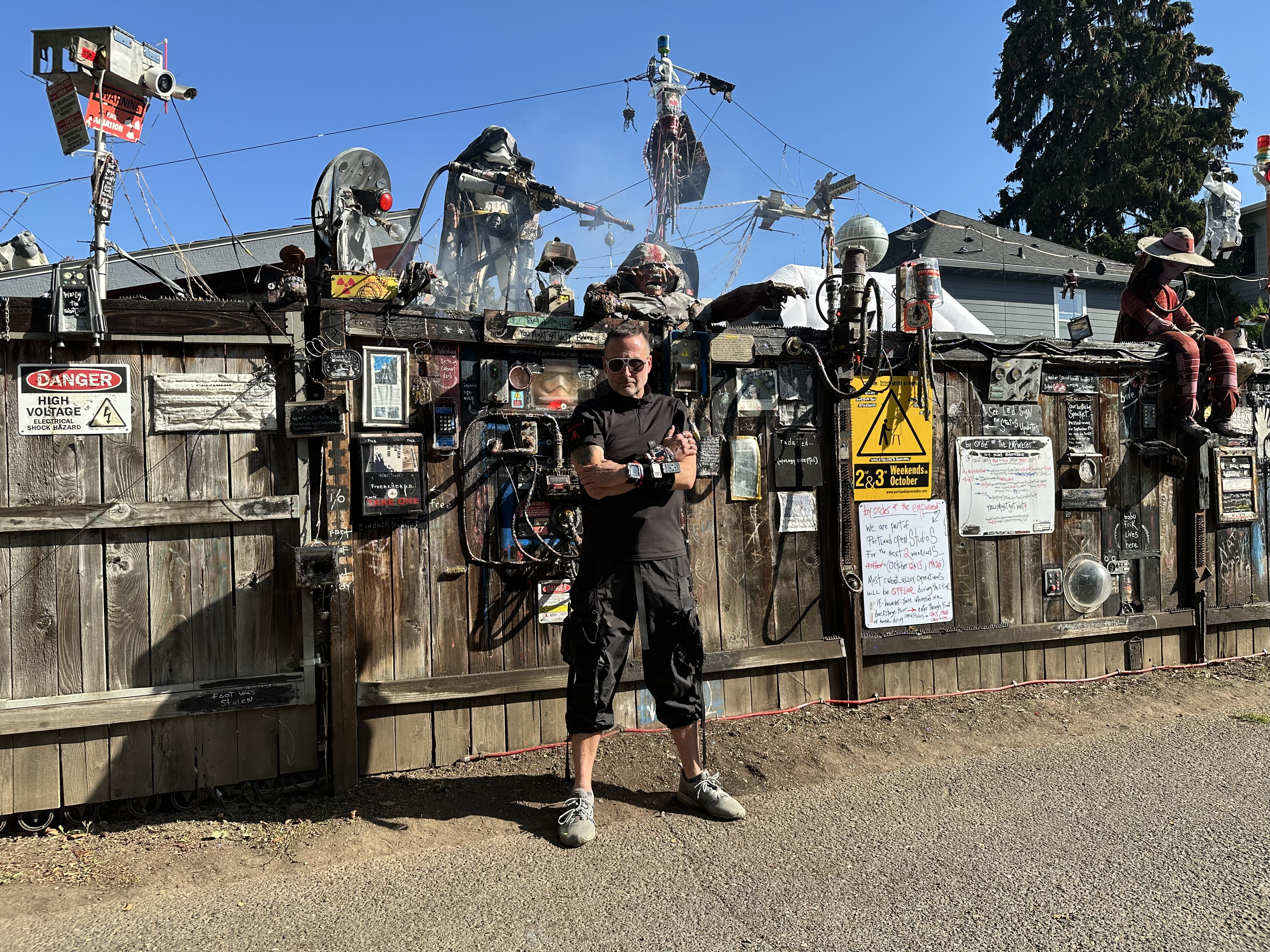
- Part of the alley, and its creator Plastorm
- Artist: Robert B. Fortney
- Completion date: Ongoing
- Medium: Mixed media
- Movement: Outsider art; street art
- Location: Portland, Oregon; 45.55418°N 122.67282°W

Robot Alley is an art installation by Robert B. Fortney, located in an alley off Skidmore Street in Portland, Oregon, United States. The installation started as a security system and has become an attraction. It depicts Star Wars characters including Stormtroopers, droids, and Sith lords.

== Description ==
The interactive installation Robot Alley is located in an alley off Skidmore Street, between Borthwick and Kerby Avenues, in the north Portland part of the Boise neighborhood. It depicts Stormtroopers, droids, Sith lords, and other Star Wars characters. The project started as a DIY security system and has become an attraction. The installation has cameras, facial recognition technology, a fog machine, LED lights, microphones, motion sensors, and a plywood AT-ST Walker by local artist Mike Bennett. Robot Alley's creator Robert Fortney, who is also a film editor, sometimes appears as "alter ego" character Plastorm, wearing armor and a helmet inspired by The Mandalorian.

== Reception ==
Robot Alley was included in the Los Angeles Times's 2023 list of twelve family-friendly activities in the Portland metropolitan area. Neighbors to the alley have reacted positively, stating that it has cut-down on crime (as originally intended), and increased the sense of community.

== See also ==
- Cultural impact of Star Wars
- Culture of Portland, Oregon
- Keep Portland Weird
- List of artists and art institutions in Portland, Oregon
- PDX Sidewalk Joy
