= Mike Bennett (artist) =

American artist

- Education: Shippensburg University of Pennsylvania
- Known for: Visual art
- Notable work: Dinolandia; Wonderwood; Snow Day Village; Portland Aquarium; Dead Media Video Rentals
- Website: mikebennettstudios.com

Mike Bennett is an American visual artist based in Portland, Oregon. He studied art education and has worked as a preschool teacher. Projects by him and Mike Bennett Studios include Dinolandia, Wonderwood, Portland Aquarium, and Dead Media Video Rentals.

== Early life and education ==
Originally from Massachusetts, Bennett was raised in central Pennsylvania. In 2012, he studied animation, art education, computer design, and illustration at Shippensburg University of Pennsylvania.

== Career and projects ==
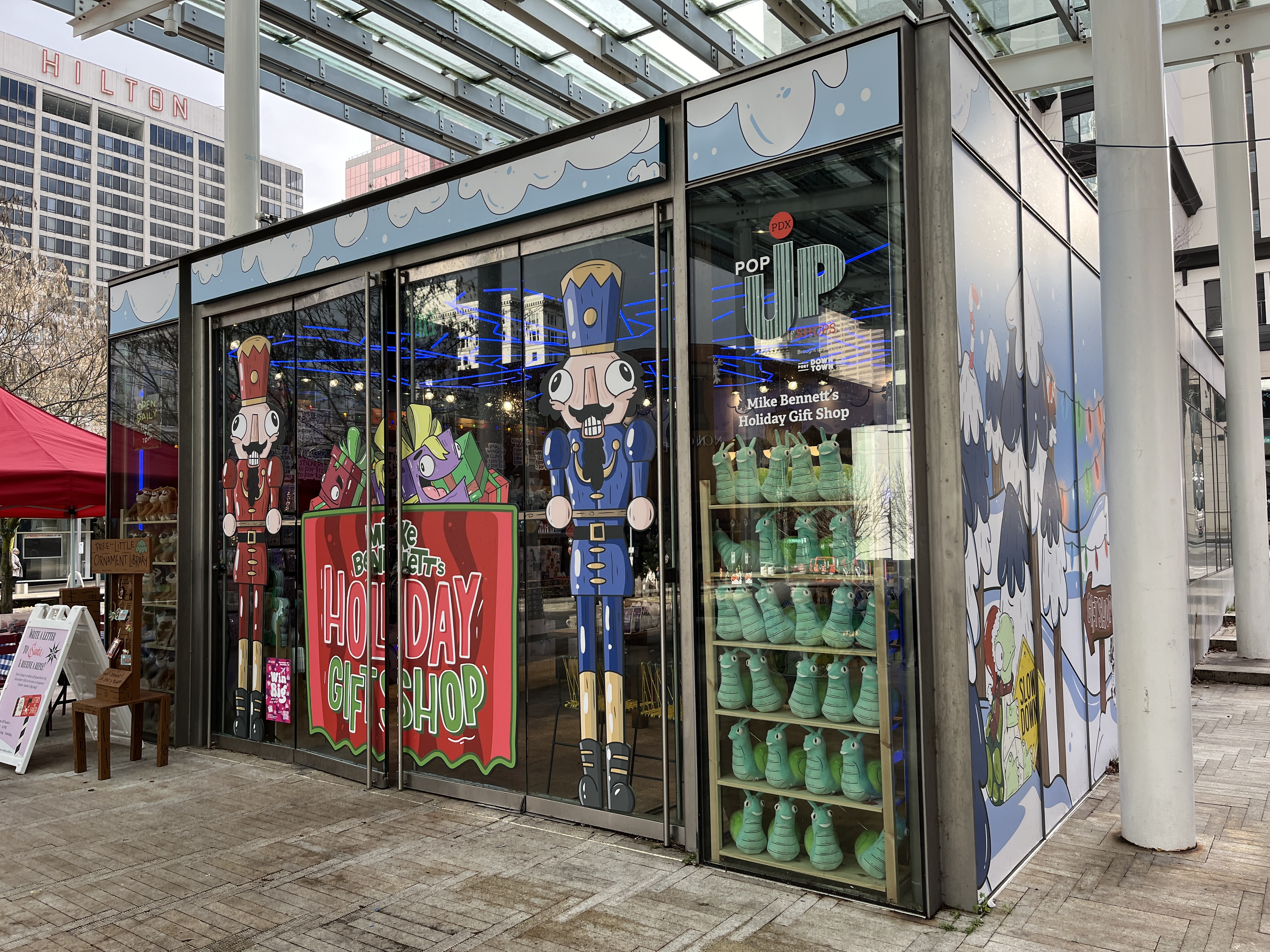
Snow Day Village, Director Park, 2024

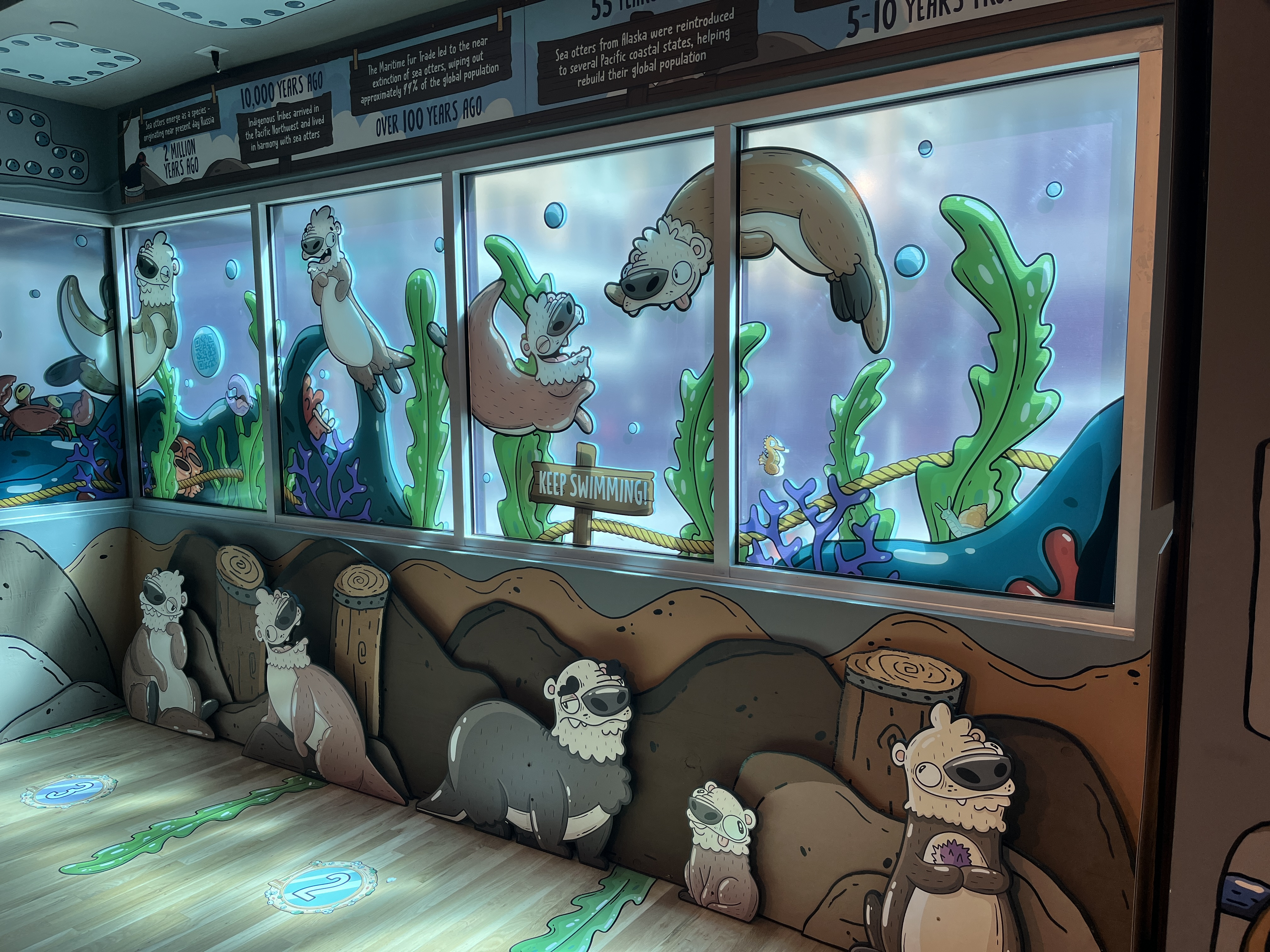
Portland Aquarium

Bennett installed large plywood cartoon characters in 2019. In 2020, he partnered with Miller Paint to offer Earth Day kits. He also hosted a collection called Crypto Zoo outside his house in 2020. Bennett's A to Zoo and A, B, Sea projects were exhibited at Director Park. Bioluminescent Beasts was displayed at Pioneer Place in 2022 as part of the Portland Winter Light Festival. Dinolandia was exhibited in downtown Portland in 2022. In 2022, Bennett presented Snow Day at a space attached to the Ace Hotel on 10th Avenue, from November 25 to December 31. The exhibit had a gift shop and original artwork. The pop-up Snow Day Village was held in Director Park in 2024 and 2025.

In 2023, Bennett hid fifty artworks for people to find as part of a Zelda-themed scavenger hunt. He also hosted a moving sale and released Halloween-themed yard art in 2023. Painted Pines was exhibited at the Lloyd Center in early 2024. The Cool Creature Crawl was held at the Oregon Zoo in 2024.

Bennet contributed a plywood work to Robot Alley. He also designed MidCity SmashedBurger's mascot, who appears in the company's logo. He opened Wonderwood in 2022. He was a Portland TedX speaker in April 2025. Bennett opened a cartoon aquarium called Portland Aquarium, in the former Public Domain Coffee space in downtown Portland later in the year. He also designed a scarf for the Portland Timbers and painted the world's longest dachshund at his studio.

In 2026, he launched a podcast called The Zooquarium Podcast, which is co-hosted by Chanel Hason. He also painted a sculpture for the art installation Wildwood: Follow the Crows.

=== Painted Pines (2024) ===
The educational art installation Painted Pines was an art installation on the top floor of the Lloyd Center, a shopping mall in the northeast Portland part of the Lloyd District. In September 2023, news outlets began reporting on Bennett's plans to open the exhibit in March 2024, with a goal of operating for two years. Bennett partnered with the advertising agency Kamp Grizzly and Lloyd Center owner Urban Renaissance Group. Painted Pines was described as a "multi-land immersive art experience" and "community playground" inspired by the nation's national parks. The exhibit was installed in a 45,098-square-foot space that previously housed a movie theater and featured four themed areas—Acrylic Alps, Critter Canyon, Geyser Gulch, and Tall Tall Timbers—with approximately 1,000 cartoon animal and plant artworks.

== Reception ==
In 2022, Bennett was recognized as a distinguished alumni of his high school for his work in the visual arts. Bennett won in the Best Visual Artist category of Willamette Week's annual 'Best of Portland' readers' poll in 2025 and 2026.

== See also ==
- List of artists and art institutions in Portland, Oregon
- List of Shippensburg University alumni
