= Mike Bennett Studios =

Maker space and studio in Portland, Oregon, U.S.

- Logo

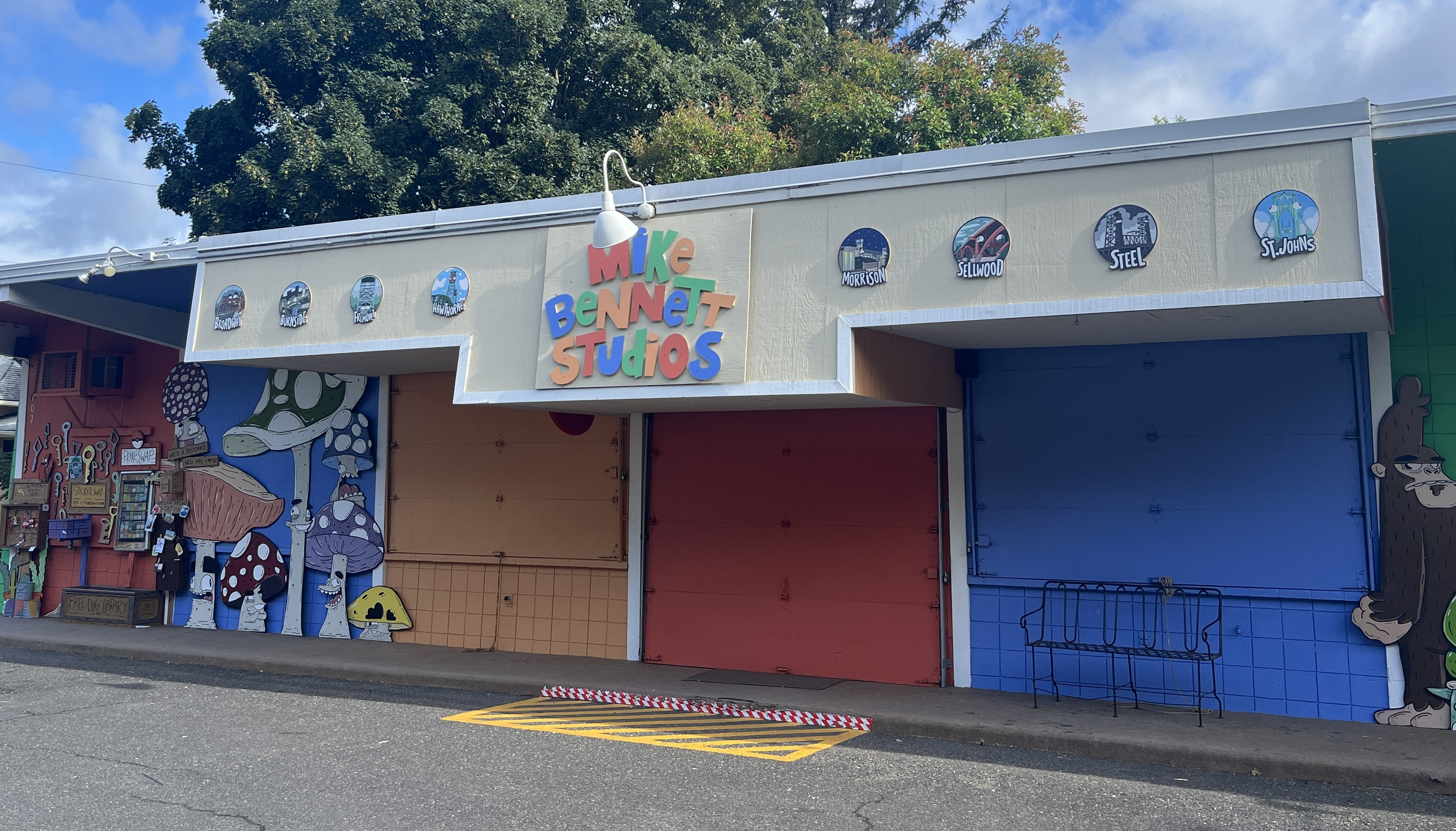
- The studio's exterior in 2026
- Interactive map of Mike Bennett Studios
- Address: 707 Northeast Fremont Street; Portland, Oregon; United States
- Coordinates: 45.5485°N 122.6584°W
- Type: Maker space; studio

Mike Bennett Studios is a maker space and studio for American artist Mike Bennett in Portland, Oregon. It operates in northeast Portland's Irvington neighborhood. Historically, "Mike Bennett Studios" has also been used as the presenting organization of works by Bennett, including Wonderwood and Portland Aquarium (2025–2026). The current studio has handicraft as well as various installations associated with PDX Sidewalk Joy.

== Description ==
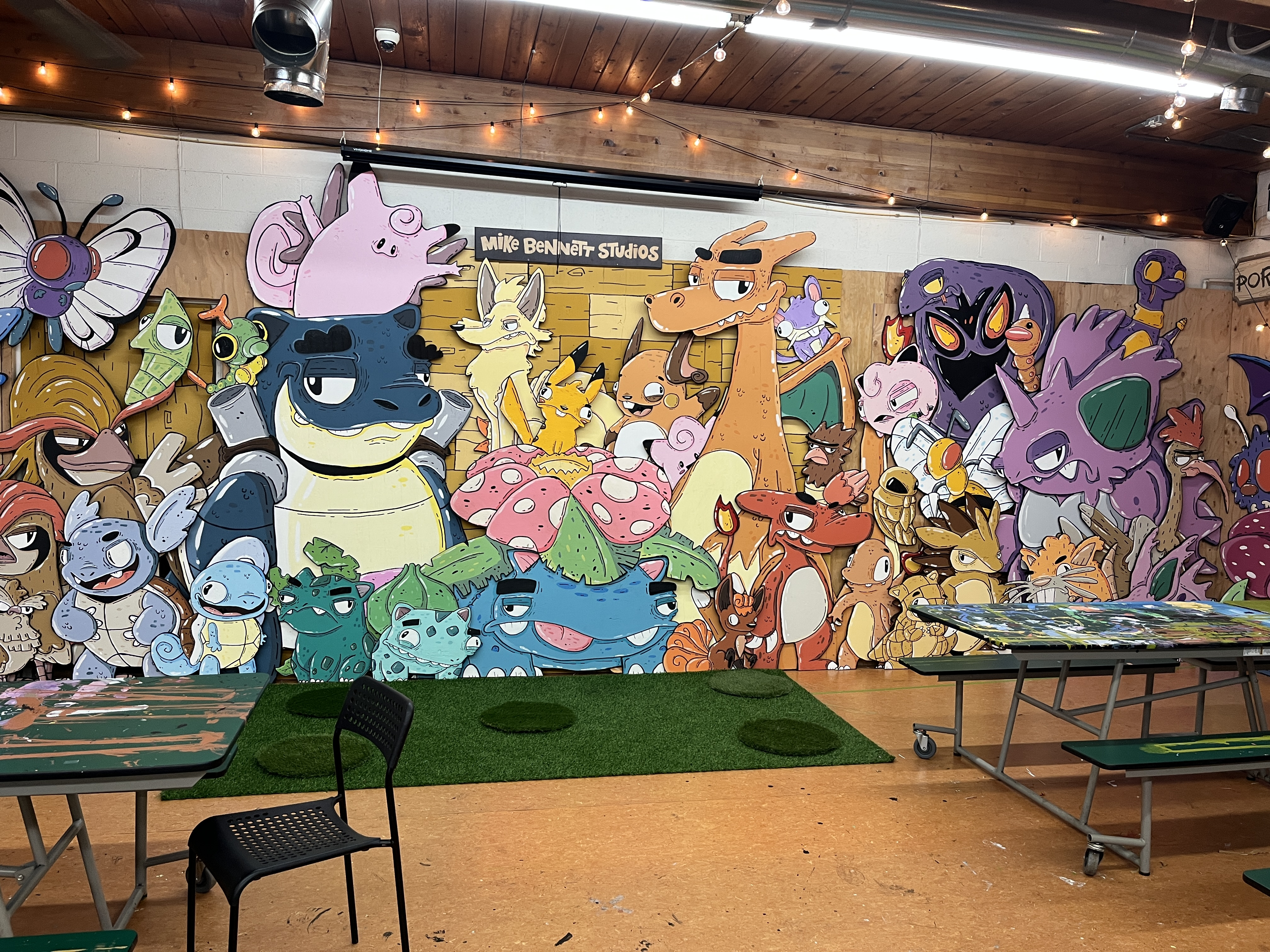
The studio's interior (2026)

Mike Bennett's maker space and studio operates on Fremont Street in northeast Portland's Irvington neighborhood. The space has handicraft and hosts classes, parties, and other events. Outside the studio are various installations associated with PDX Sidewalk Joy, including exchanges for keychains, Pokémon trading cards, and stickers. There is also a dog library with tennis balls.

Historically, "Mike Bennett Studios" has also been used as the presenting organization of works by Bennett, including Wonderwood and Portland Aquarium (2025–2026), which had a Mike Bennett Studios gift shop and museum.

== History ==
The studio has hosted various activities, events, and installations. The Portland Keychain Library is a keychain exchange operated by Bennett at the studio. The keychain library was refurbished and relocated to the studio in 2025. Previously, Bennett operated the exchange in the St. Johns neighborhood. The keychain library has inspired similar exchanges in Baltimore, Greencastle, Indiana, and dozens of other cities in the United States, as well as in Winnipeg, Manitoba, Canada.

In November 2025, Bennett organized an event at the studio to create the "world's largest dachshund" to raise funds for a local organization that provides food and other services to pets. Members of the public who assisted with the project received custom paintbrushes and stickers. The event raised approximately $5,000.

In June 2026, the studio hosted Mr. Chip, a vending machine with approximately 25 varieties of chips. Options rotated and the machine also stocked chip-themed art as well as Mr. Chip merchandise such as chip clips, embroidered patches, and stickers. The owner of Mr. Chip, Keith Dickerson, offered samples during the machine's "grand opening".

In October 2026, the studio began hosting Dead Media Video Rentals, described by KOIN as an "immersive, walk-through haunted attraction featuring famous movie monsters". The exhibit has 26 illustrations of monsters representing letters of the Latin alphabet, including characters from traditional horror films. The studio also hosted "The Spooktacular", a series of family-friendly block parties with music and other activities. In late October 2026, hundreds of parents gathered at the studio to participate in a letter-writing campaign directed at Portland Public Schools regarding a plan to close as many as 14 schools.

== Reception ==
Mike Bennett Studios won in the Best Community Arts Space category of Willamette Week's annual 'Best of Portland' readers' poll in 2026.

== See also ==
- Culture of Portland, Oregon
- List of artists and art institutions in Portland, Oregon
