= Dead Media Video Rentals =

2026 haunted attraction by Mike Bennett in Portland, Oregon, U.S.

- The haunted attraction's logo
- Artist: Mike Bennett
- Year: 2026
- Location: Portland, Oregon, United States

Dead Media Video Rentals was a haunted attraction by American artist Mike Bennett in Portland, Oregon, United States. Installed at his studio in Northeast Portland's Irvington neighborhood for October and early November 2026, the immersive haunted house-themed exhibit featured cartoon wooden figures in Bennett's signature style, depicting monsters from horror films. The interior also had film posters, theatrical smoke, and VHS tapes. Dead Media Video Rentals also had a gift shop with merchandise and other products, as well as other activities such as musical improvisation performances. Media outlets described the family-friendly exhibit as "creepy", "spooky", and "whimsical".

== Description ==
Entrance to the exhibit

Mike Bennett's haunted attraction Dead Media Video Rentals was installed at his studio in Northeast Portland's Irvington neighborhood. The immersive, walk-through haunted house-themed exhibit featured cartoon wooden figures of monsters from horror films. The Portland Mercury described Dead Media Video Rentals as a "goofy, imaginative wooden cutout pop-up" with "an alphabet of movie monsters".

Guests are tasked with trying to find missing shop manager–owner Jason "Freddy" Bennett, who is portrayed by Bennett on a display device, amidst halls lined with VHS tapes. The exhibit also had film posters, VHS boxes, lighting, and theatrical smoke. Jump scares were not included. Like many of Bennett's projects, the exhibit includes a gift shop with merchandise and other products such as art, beanies, cutouts, lawn signs, stickers, and T-shirts.

The family-friendly, ADA-compliant event was open during 2–8 p.m. on Wednesdays, Thursdays, and Sundays, and during 2–9 p.m. on Fridays and Saturdays, during October and early November 2026. There was no admission fee; donations were accepted via QR code payment.

=== Characters ===
Four of the cartoon characters

The fictional video library depicted characters from films spanning the 1930s to present. There were a total of 26 movie monsters, each representing different letters of the Latin alphabet. Among the characters were Thing One and Thing Two from Dr. Seuss's 1957 children's book The Cat in the Hat and its adaptations, as well as aliens and zombies.

The letter "D" was represented by Dracula (also known as Count Dracula), the titular character of Bram Stoker's 1897 novel Dracula. The letter "F" was represented by Frankenstein (also known as Frankenstein's monster), a character created by English writer Mary Shelley. The letter "P" was represented by Pennywise (also known as It), the clown and main antagonist of Stephen King's 1986 novel It, and its adaptations. The letter "X" was represented by Xenomorph, a fictional endoparasitoid extraterrestrial species and the main antagonists of both the Alien and Alien vs. Predator franchises.

== History ==
Window display (top) and interior hallway (bottom) with VHS tapes

Prior to Dead Media Video Rentals, Bennett had other projects related to Halloween. In October 2020, during the COVID-19 pandemic, he hosted the cryptozoology-related pop-up Crypto Zoo outside his house in Northeast Portland's Alberta Arts District. The collection featured new daily illustrations of cryptids such as Bigfoot, a jackalope, and the Loveland frog. In 2021, Bennett followed with the pop-up Crypto-Zoo: Museum of Mystery, which featured 26 plywood characters (one for each letter of the alphabet). The collection was installed at a former bank building in North Portland's St. Johns neighborhood and had appearances by llamas and the street performer known as the Unipiper. In October 2023, Bennett released a series a Halloween decorations, including lawn signs and window clings. The set depicted ghosts, gravestones, "spooky" pumpkins, and zombie arms.

Engineer and software developer Lorenzo Moon assisted Bennet with Dead Media Video Rentals. The studio hosted other Halloween-themed activities during Dead Media Video Rentals, such as performances by the local musical improvisation group Easy Back Coven, described by the Portland Tribune as "Portland's queer musical witches". An event series called "The Spooktacular" was held on October 3, 10, 17, 24, and 31, featuring Easy Back Coven and other performers. The events invited members of the public to donate food items for the Q Center, a local LGBTQ community center. Dead Media Video Rentals was open until November 8, 2026.

Bennett installed a "holiday edition" of Dead Media in the downtown Portland space that previously housed Portland Aquarium (2025–2026). Similar to Dead Media Video Rentals, the installation features cartoon characters of holiday films. According to Hannah Siebold of the Portland Tribune, Mike Bennett's Dead Media: Holiday Special "blends the charm of a vintage VHS rental store with elements of Bennett's popular Snow Day Village" and has "familiar characters, playful details and a touch of spooky humor". The free and family-friendly installation opened on November 13, 2026.

== Reception ==
Hannah Seibold of the Portland Tribune called the exhibit "creepy" and "a spooky experience without the intensity of a traditional haunted house". Joe Streckert of the Portland Mercury said the exhibit was "whimsical" and "for small children learning about the alphabet". He opined, "If you have a small child who likes scary things they'll have a great time... There are some delightful deep cuts here for horror fans. If you're the kind of person who remembers that Q – The Winged Serpent exists, you'll have fun recognizing obscure horror movies from decades past."

== See also ==
- 2026 in art
- Culture of Portland, Oregon
- Halloween in Portland, Oregon
- List of haunted attractions
- Monster movie
  - List of monster movies
