= Frank Silas Doernbecher House =

Historic building in Portland, Oregon, U.S.

- U.S. National Register of Historic Places
- U.S. Historic district – Contributing property
- Portland Historic Landmark
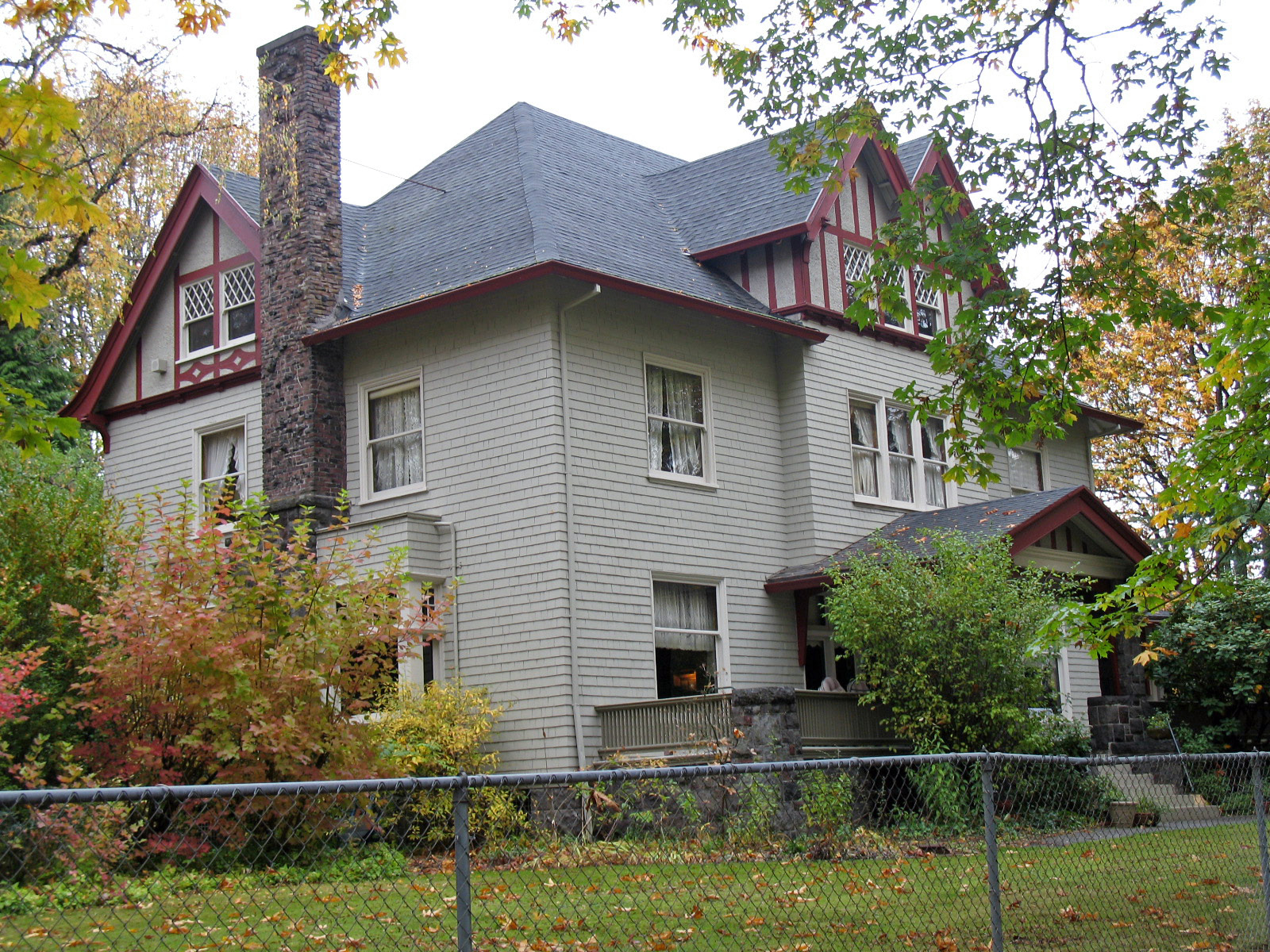
- The house's exterior in 2009

- Location within Portland, Oregon
- Location: 2323 NE Tillamook Street; Portland, Oregon
- Coordinates: 45°32′16″N 122°38′30″W
- Area: 0.6 acres (0.24 ha)
- Built: c. 1903; 123 years ago
- Architectural style: Tudor Revival
- Part of: Irvington Historic District (ID10000850)
- NRHP reference No.: 78002311
- Added to NRHP: March 14, 1978

The Frank Silas Doernbecher House is a Tudor-Revival mansion located in Northeast Portland, Oregon, United States. It is listed on the National Register of Historic Places.

The house was built circa 1903 for Portland businessman Frank S. Doernbecher (1861–1921), who founded the Doernbecher Furniture Company in Tacoma, Washington, and upon moving to Portland in 1900 established the Doernbecher Manufacturing Company. Doernbecher also made a $200,000 donation to build the Doernbecher Children's Hospital in Portland.

== Article Body ==
=== Frank Silas Doernbecher ===
Born in Kewaksum, Wisconsin in 1861, Frank Silas Doernbecher, born to Silas Doernbecher, a German political exile, spent his first 27 years learning about the furniture industry from his father. After moving to Tacoma, Washington, Doernbecher established the Doernbecher Furniture Company. In 1900, Doernbecher set his sights on a rapidly growing city along the Willamette River named Portland where he would take his business and become a leader in his industry.

Frank Doernbecher died in 1921 at the age of 59 in Portland. As a final act of goodwill, he portioned off a quarter of his estate to be donated to the City of Portland to continue his work in growing the city after his death. His two children, Edward and Ada Doernbecher, decided to give the money to the University of Oregon Medical School on Marquam Hill (now Oregon Health and Science University) to create the first dedicated children's hospital in Oregon. The Doernbecher Memorial Hospital for Children opened in 1926 and has been serving the children of Portland, Oregon, and the nation ever since.

=== Architecture ===
The Frank Silas Doernbecher House was listed on the National Register of Historic Places on March 14, 1978. The Tudor Revival mansion is located in the Irvington neighborhood in Portland, which is lined with maple trees has a park-like setting that was the custom during the 20th century in that area. The home is rectangular and was built with a front porch, porte-cochère and several bays and projections. The walls are made of cedar shingles, and the gable ends are made with stucco. Other notable features include brick chimney stacks, leaded window panes, and a pointed window arch. The Doernbecher House is also known for its wood paneling and hand-carved decoration throughout. The house was registered in 1978 because of the significance of the entrepreneur who built it. It was occupied by the children and grandchildren of Frank Doernbecher until it was sold in 1976. it continues to be a private residence. The house has since had its utilities updated but maintains its architectural significance.

== See also ==
- National Register of Historic Places listings in Northeast Portland, Oregon
