= Public Domain Coffee =

Defunct coffee shop in Portland, Oregon, U.S.

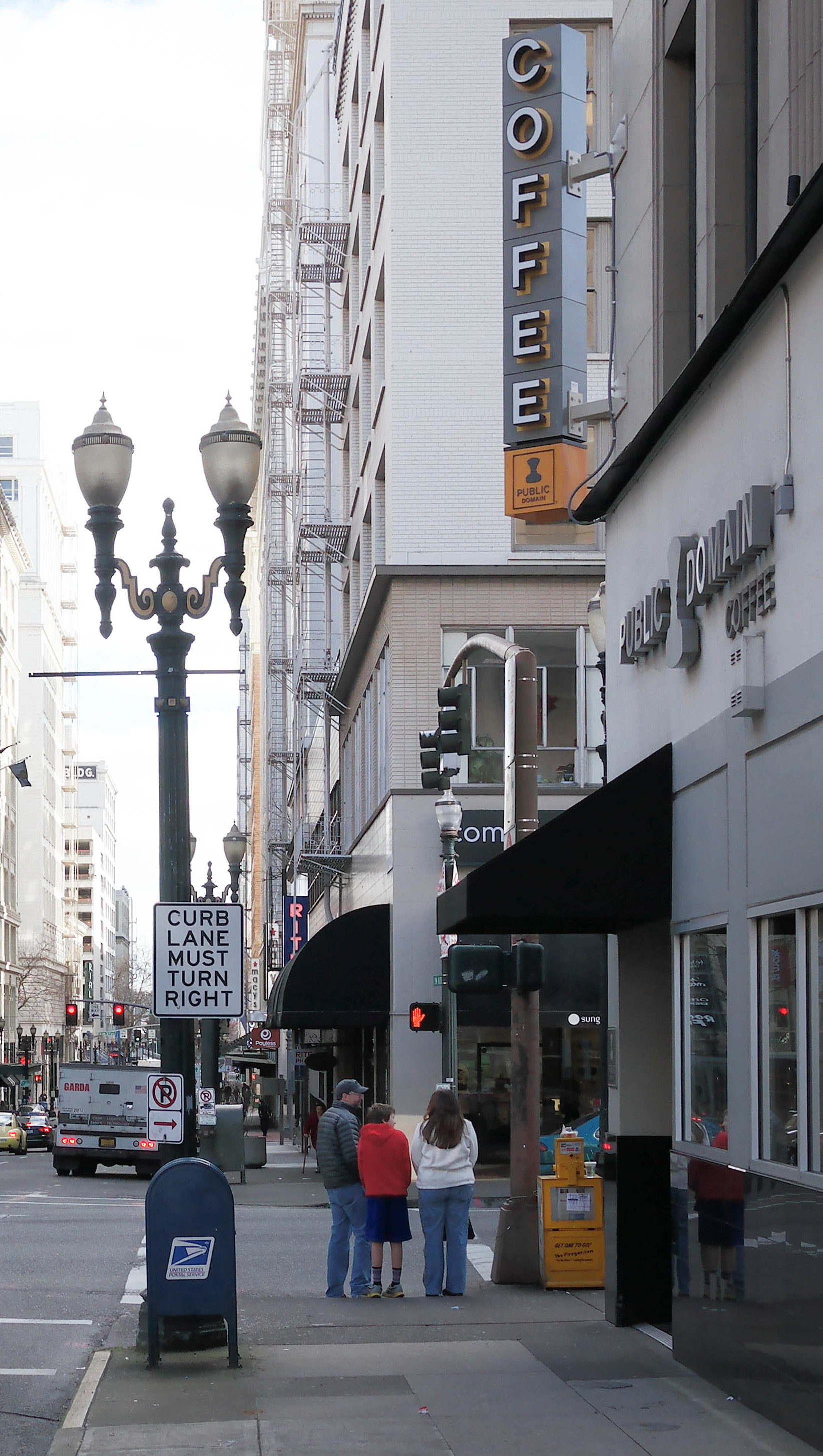
- The coffee shop's exterior, 2014
- Interactive map of Public Domain Coffee

Restaurant information
- Established: 2010
- Owner: Coffee Bean International
- Location: 603 Southwest Broadway, Portland, Multnomah, Oregon, 97205, United States
- Coordinates: 45.5200°N 122.6795°W

Public Domain Coffee was a coffee shop in Portland, Oregon, United States. Coffee Bean International opened the cafe in 2010. The coffee shop closed during the 2020s.

== Description and history ==
Coffee Bean International (CBI) opened Public Domain in 2010, following a rebrand of Portland Coffee House. The coffee shop on Southwest Alder served as CBI's "showcase cafe" and specialized in pour-over coffee, according to Grant Butler of The Oregonian. The name was derived from the business' mission, which is "to roast exceptional coffees and cultivate a passion for coffee among the public".

Nick Brown of Daily Coffee News called Public Domain an "upscale retail bar concept". Lonely Planet described the coffee shop as "a swanky downtown outlet with shiny high-end espresso machines, owned by long-time indie roasters". In her Insiders' Guide to Portland, Oregon, Rachel Dresbeck said Public Domain had "beautifully roasted single-origin varieties and a state-of-the-art Slayer espresso".

Public Domain began offering private cuppings and guided tastings in 2010. In 2012, the coffee shop hosted tastings in conjunction with an SCAA event described as "the specialty coffee industry's largest annual gathering". Public Domain competed in NWRBC in 2013, and was CBI's only retail outlet, as of 2015. Farmer Brothers acquired CBI.

In March 2021, Molly J. Smith of Eater Portland wrote, "Public Domain Coffee downtown appears permanently closed with boarded-up windows, but its Facebook page has been advertising subscriptions as recently as February 2020 and Google lists the closure as temporary." The Portland Business Journal said Public Domain "remains closed up tight", as of September 2022. In 2025, artist Mike Bennett relocated his studio and opened a cartoon aquarium where the coffee shop used to operate.

== Reception ==
In 2010, Hanna Neuschwander of Willamette Week said Public Domain was "exactly what you'd expect of a carefully, but cautiously designed corporate coffeehouse for high-quality coffee". Condé Nast Traveler's Alexandra Jacobs called Public Domain a "purist’s café".

In Left Coast Roast: A Guide to the Best Coffee and Roasters from San Francisco to Seattle (2012), Hanna Neuschwander said CBI "largely flew under the public's radar until 2010, when it opened Public Domain, a flagship café in downtown Portland". She wrote:

CBI and Public Domain invert the commonplace idea that bigger equals badder. Though only about 5 percent of CBI's coffee meets the highest standard of quality, the green buying team spends up to half its time finding and perfecting these gems, which are sold at Public Domain. The café is also among the few places to get great coffee in Portland's downtown core.

Alexandra E. Petri included Public Domain in The Daily Meal's 2014 list of 7 coffee shops to visit in Portland.
