= Wonderwood =

Art and event space in Portland, Oregon, U.S.

- Wonderwood's logo
- Interactive map of Wonderwood
- Address: 7410 North Chicago Avenue; Portland, Oregon; United States
- Coordinates: 45.5915°N 122.7558°W
- Owner: Mike Bennett

Construction
- Opened: October 15, 2022

Wonderwood is an immersive art installation space with an adjoining coffee shop called Wonderwood Springs, in Portland, Oregon, United States. Artist Mike Bennett opened both spaces in north Portland's St. Johns neighborhood in 2022. The art installation space was converted into the nine-hole miniature golf course Wonderwood Springs Mini-Golf in 2024.

== Description ==
A visitor trading items at Wonderwood’s "Free Little Mall"

Wonderwood is a 7,000-square-foot immersive space with rotating art exhibits and an adjoining coffee shop called Wonderwood Springs, in the St. Johns neighborhood of north Portland. The art space is set in the fictional town of Maplehold, and is housed in a 1913 building previously used by Bank of America.

=== Wonderwood Springs ===
The medieval-themed Wonderwood Springs hosts art (including hundreds of hand-painted characters by the owner), antiques, and live performances. Willamette Week said the coffee shop is "essentially a museum of more than 400 hand-painted Bennett pieces, ranging from cute woodland creatures to a sleeping dragon ... arranged alongside a hodgepodge of antiques, like old chests, bird cages and other items donated by Bennett's fans, making for a quirkier Applebee's-style wall display". The Oregonian and the Portland Business Journal have described Wonderwood Springs as "whimsical". The coffee shop also has an outdoor patio, which was added in 2024.

Menu options include breakfast sandwiches, pastries from nearby Sparrow Bakery, ciders, coffee, hot chocolate with marshmallows (including a mushroom variety), and tea. Other drink options include Level Beer brews, canned cocktails, wine, a non-alcoholic mead latte with black tea, orange zest, and honey, and a spiced latte with pureed sweet potato and spiced syrup. The restaurant's Butter Brew Latte uses a house-made butter toffee sauce. Coffee blends include the Up All Knight house roast and the decaffeinated Mellow Mage. Seared pork loin was added to the menu in 2024. Soft serve options include chocolate, vanilla, and vegan (oat) vanilla.

== History ==
In 2022, Bennett opened Wonderwood and Wonderwood Springs on October 15. The coffee shop operates in the space previously occupied by See See Motor Coffee, in partnership with the Sortis Holdings-owned coffee consulting company Coffee Business. Wonderwood's score was created by musician and comic Billy Kelly. Other collaborators on the project included lighting designer Sean Patrick Forsythe and sculptor and curator Lana Crooks, who had previously helped Bennett with his local Dinolandia exhibit.

Wonderwood's opening exhibit The Scourge of Castle Maplehold, which lasted until December 2022, featured hand-painted figures including a rat king and a tree wizard. A "nautical pirate adventure" was planned for 2023.

In September 2023, ownership was transferred to Bennett and former Sortis employee Teddy Albertson. The transition was accompanied by multi-week temporary closure for renovations and a picket line by former employees.

In 2024, the art installation space was converted into a miniature golf course, and former Paley's Place executive chef Luis Cabanas developed a new menu to accompany the addition of the outdoor patio. Wonderwood Springs Mini-Golf has been described as a family-friendly nine-hole "immersive experience". The course features artwork by Bennett, and each hole has a distinct story and theme. There are golf balls that come out of their holes and floors that spin. The fifth hole, called Poop Shack Panic, sees the character Butt Wizard as the Mayor of Maplehold.

For Election Day in 2024, Wonderwood Springs gave away "I Voted" stickers and closed early so employees could vote. In June 2026, the business offered half-price admission on golf with a same-day receipt from a local business.

== Reception ==
Wonderwood Springs won in the Best Golf Course category of Willamette Week's annual 'Best of Portland' readers' poll in 2025 and 2026. It also placed second in the Best Date Night Activity category and was a finalist in the Best Place for Family Fun category in 2025. Wonderwood Springs' The Rat King also placed second in the Best Mascot category in 2025.

== See also ==
- Culture of Portland, Oregon
