= Capitol Hill Wishing Tree =

Tourist attraction in Seattle, Washington, U.S.

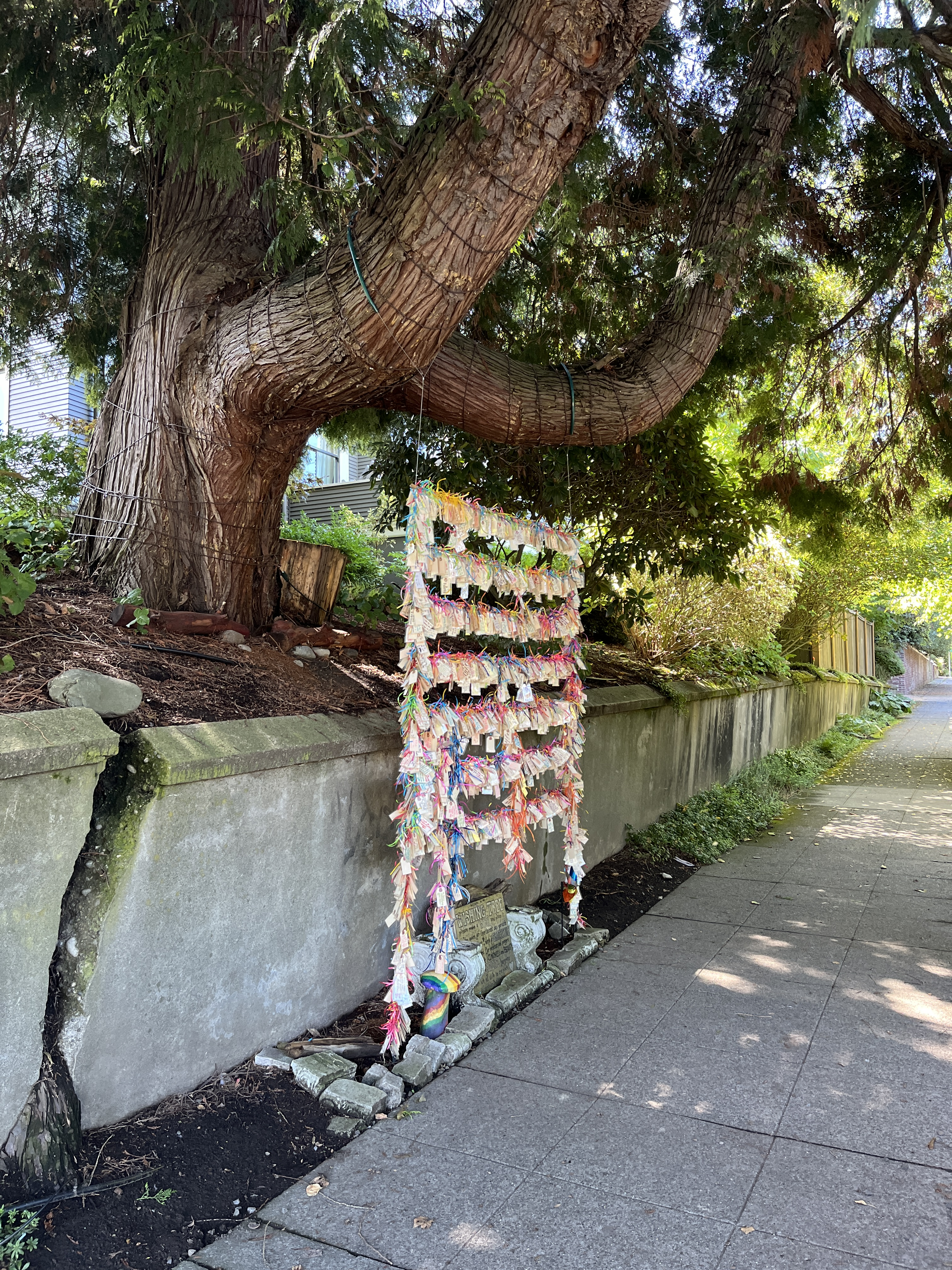
- The wish tree in 2024
- Location: Seattle, Washington, U.S.
- Location within Washington (state)
- Coordinates: 47°37′56″N 122°18′18″W

The Capitol Hill Wishing Tree is a wish tree on Seattle's Capitol Hill, in the U.S. state of Washington. Since 2013, tens of thousands of wishes have been made at the site, which is considered a tourist attraction.

== Description and history ==
The cypress at the intersection of East Galer Street and 21st Avenue East has been used for making wishes since 2013. Owner Jane Hamel began sharing paper and writing utensils in November 2014. Approximately 30,000 wishes have been made at the site, according to The Seattle Times. Considered a tourist attraction, the wish tree has been featured in guide books and on Google Maps, and is often visited by students on field trips.

Instructions, paper, and writing utensils are provided at the site, which also features a table and seating. Hamel laminates and hangs the paper wishes. The tree was vandalized in 2023. Christmas lights have been added to the tree during the holiday season.

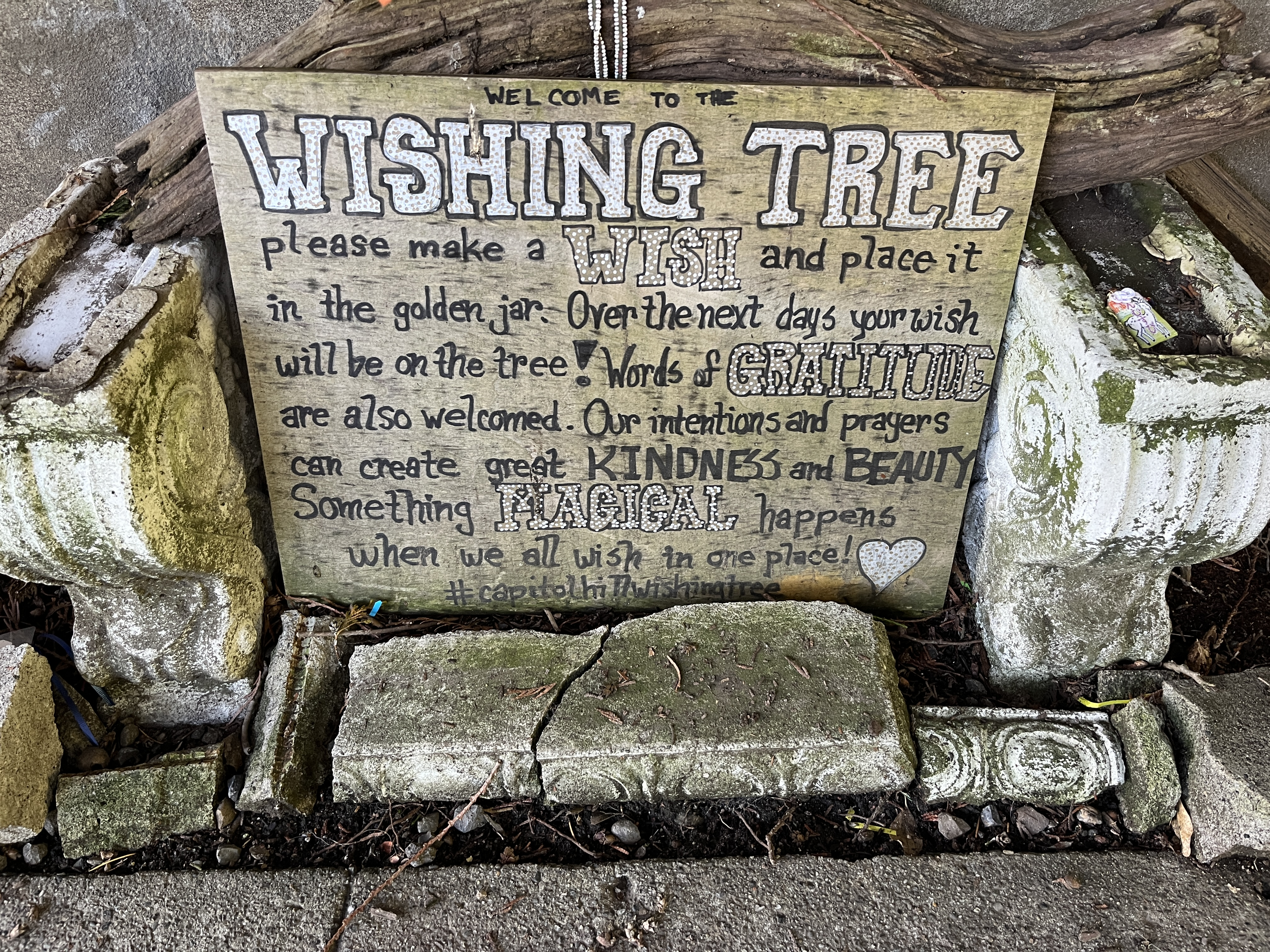

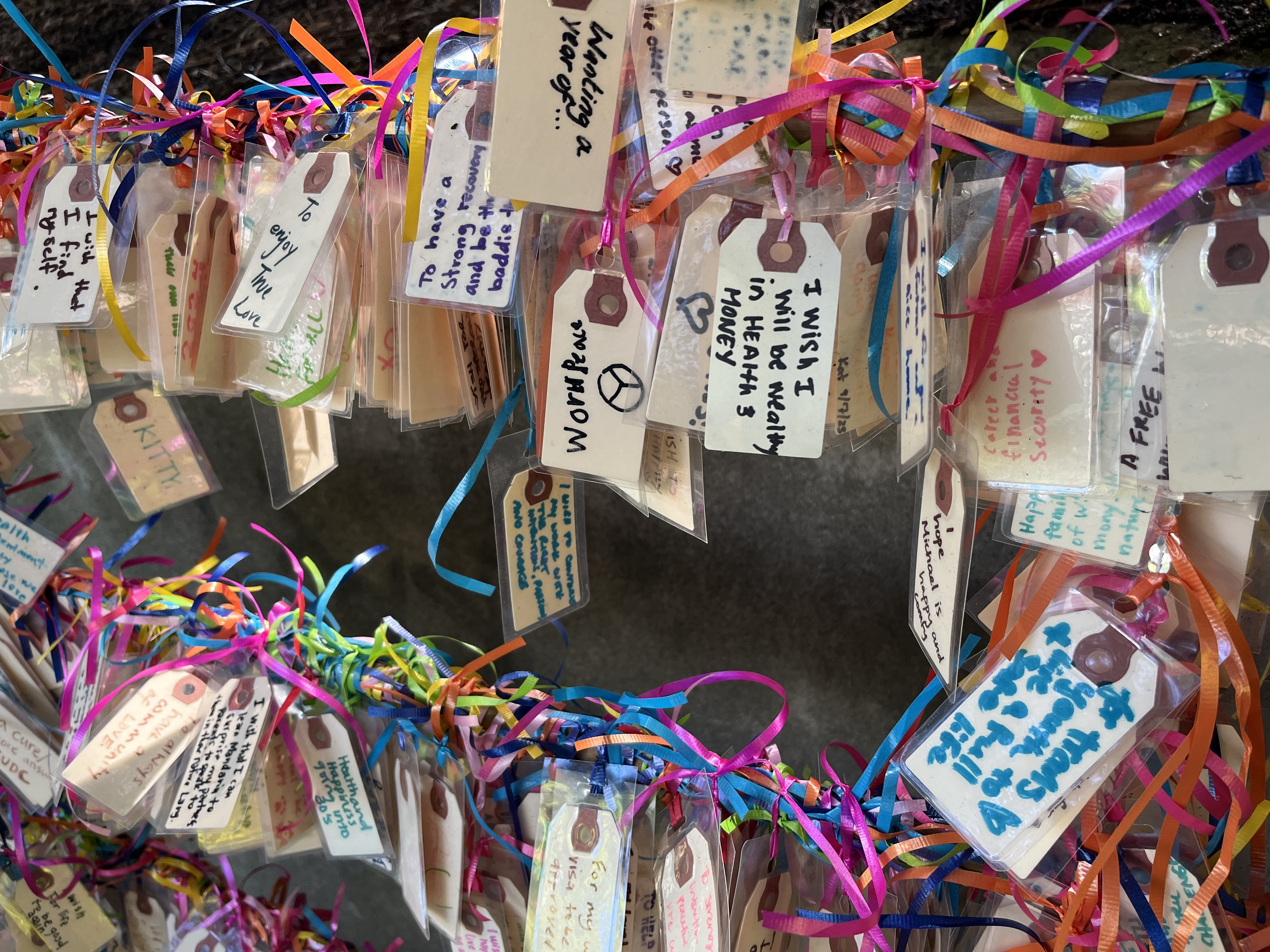
