= PDX Sidewalk Joy =

Sidewalk display project in Portland, Oregon, U.S.

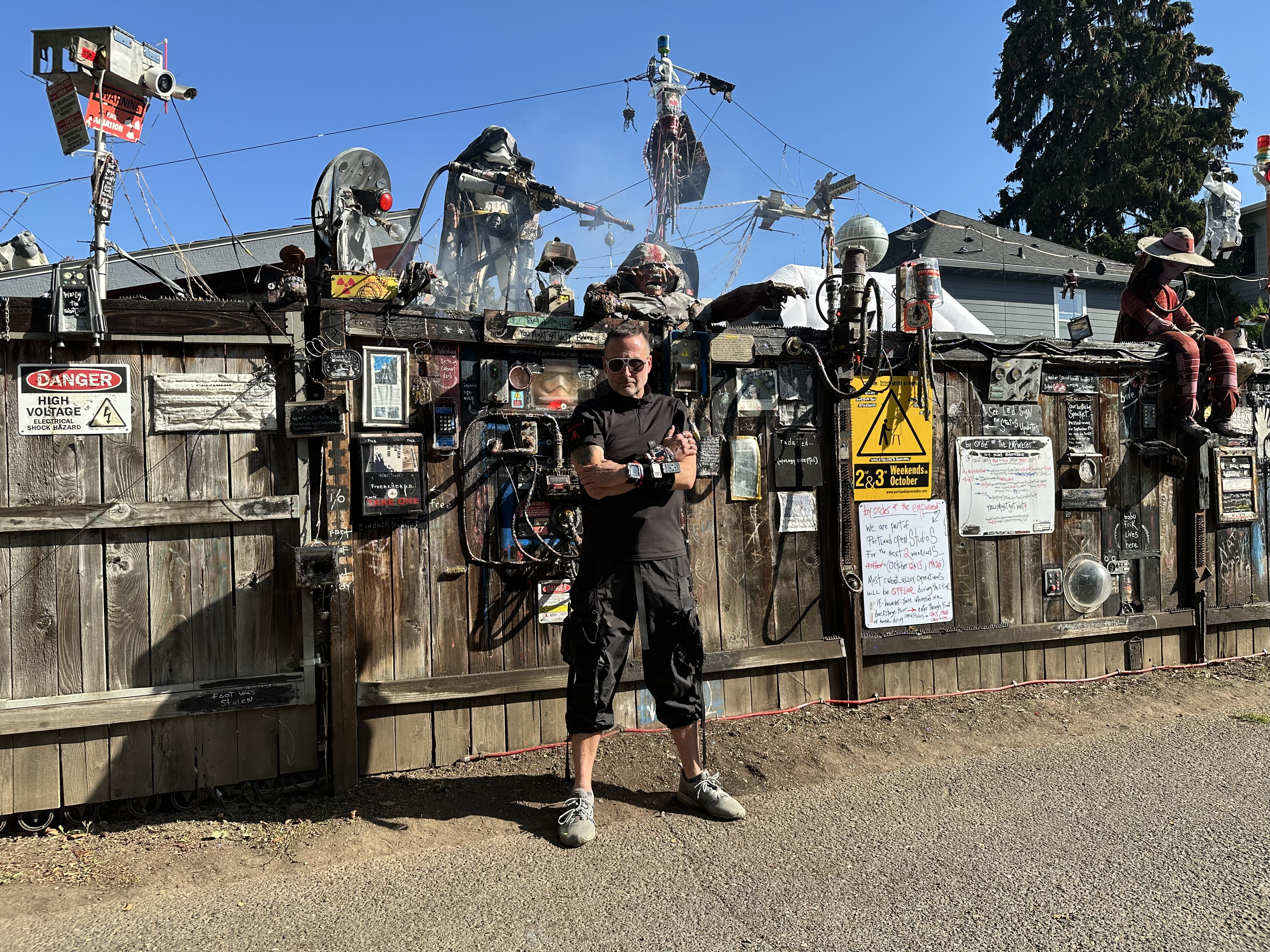
The art installation Robot Alley, which is part of the project PDX Sidewalk Joy, and its creator

PDX Sidewalk Joy is a project to create and map neighborhood sidewalk displays such as little libraries, art installations, exchanges, and other forms of community engagement. The project was co-created by Rachael Harms Mahlandt and Grant Brady of PDXFLAG (Portland Free Little Art Gallery).

== Installations ==
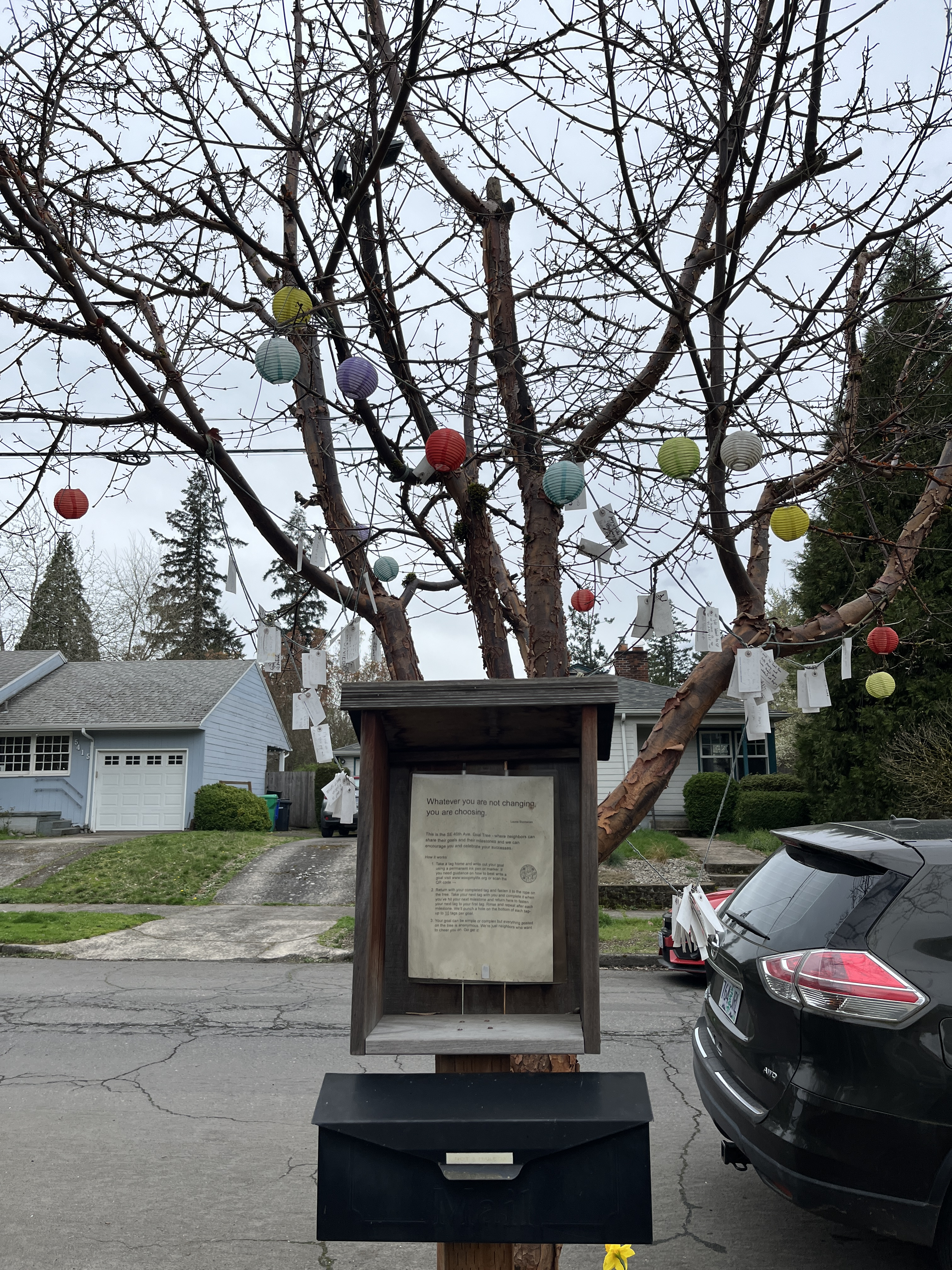
The Goal Tree (pictured in 2025) in southeast Portland is among the city's wish trees.

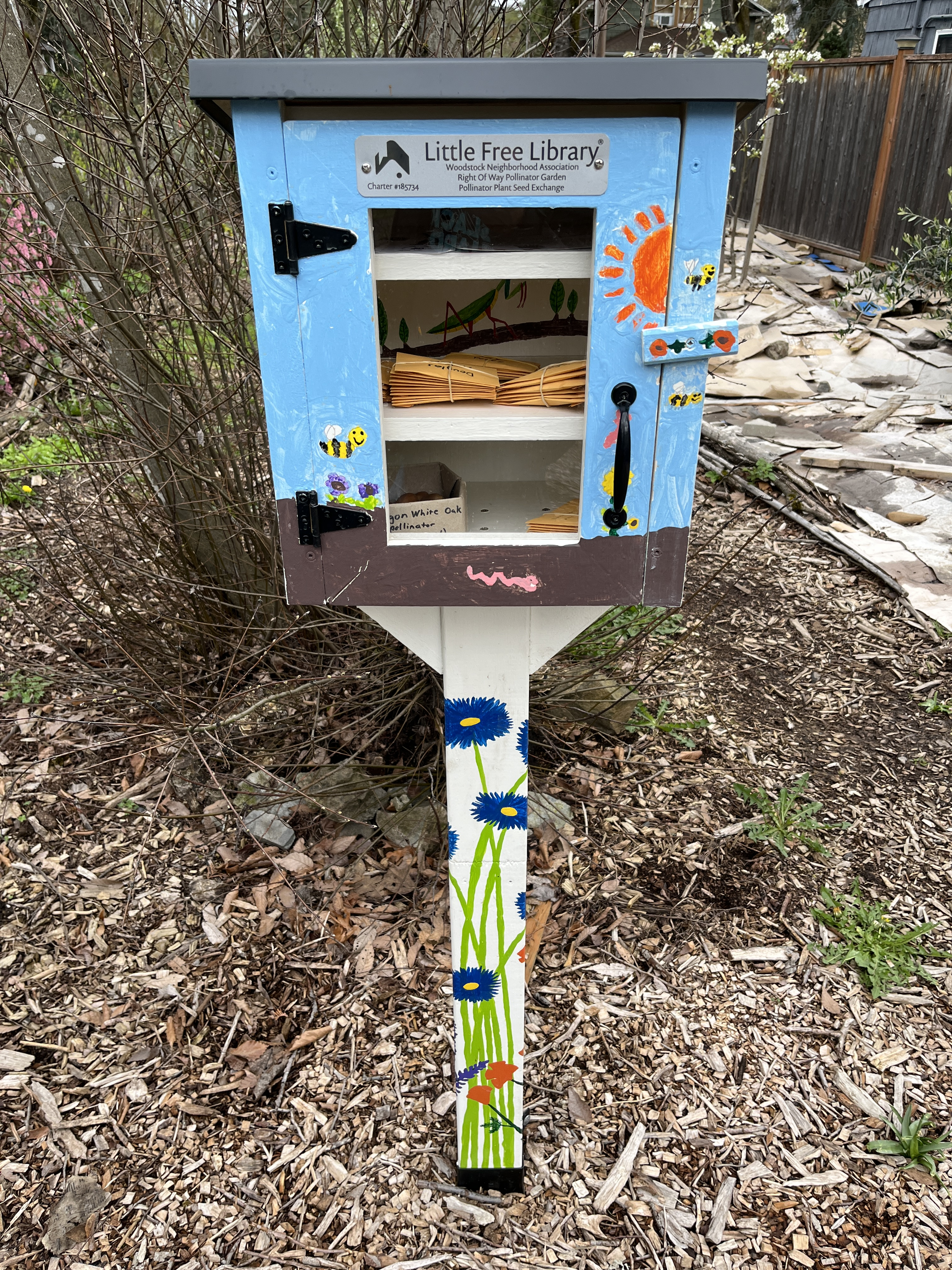
Woodstock Native Seed Exchange, Woodstock, 2025

There are approximately 100 sites, including:

- 79th Street Diorama, Southeast Portland
- Be Kind VHS Depot, Southeast 45th and Center Street
- Canted Spruce, Northeast Portland
- Car Library, Northeast 20th Avenue near Freemont Street
- Chickie Crossing, Northeast Portland
- Comics Cottage, Southeast Rhone Street between 56th and 57th Avenues, created by Rebecca Marrall
- Dino Exchange
- Friend Swap, Northeast Klickitat Street and 26th Avenue
- Lantern Diorama, Southeast Portland
- Lego Minifig Exchange, Southeast 42nd Avenue and Cora Street, created by Rebecca Peterson
- Little Free Greenhouse, Montavilla
- Little Ghost Library, Southeast 18th and Tolman
- Lucky Dog Library, Southeast Portland
- Milkweed Seed Station, Northeast 24th Avenue and Klickitat Street
- Mike Bennett Studios
- Morrison Street Mini Gallery, Southeast Portland
- Mt. Tabor Creations, Southeast Portland
- PDX Dinorama, Southeast Morrison Street and 78th Avenue, created by Rachael Harms Mahlandt
- PDX Flag (or Portland Free Little Art Gallery), Southeast 57th Avenue and Rhone Street, created by Grant Brady
- Poetry Pottery Box, Southeast Portland
- Post Mabone, Southeast Portland
- Robot Alley, North Portland
- Rose City Puzzle Library
- Sidewalk Ducks, Northeast 14th Place and Emerson Street, created by Coley Lehman
- Skelekrewe, Southeast Portland
- Spring of Hope, Northeast 20th Avenue, near Fremont Street
- Super Awesome Prizes, Northeast Thompson Street and 11th Avenue
- Teeny Tiny Little Free Library
- Tiny Creature Swap, Northeast 21st Avenue, near Knott Street, Irvington, created by Ava and Russell Swank
- Twin Pines Country Club, Southeast 85th Avenue and Clay Street
- Ultra Tiny Free Library

In addition to Lego Minifig Exchange, there is another Lego minifigure exchange in southeast Portland's Sellwood-Moreland neighborhood.

== See also ==
- Culture of Portland, Oregon
- Little Free Library
- Wish trees in Portland, Oregon
