= Portland Metro Chamber =

Chamber of commerce for Portland, Oregon, U.S.

- Location: Portland, Oregon, United States
- Board of directors: 75 members
- Key people: Andrew Hoan (President & CEO); Ariana Alejandres (Vice President of Finance & Operations); Jon Isaacs (Executive Vice President of Public Affairs); T.J. McHugh (Director of Government Relations); Katie Mongue (Vice President of Strategic Communications)
- Formerly called: Portland Trade Board (1870-1890); Portland Chamber of Commerce (1890-1984); Portland Metropolitan Chamber (1984-2001); Portland Business Alliance (2001-2023)

Portland Metro Chamber is the chamber of commerce for the Portland metropolitan area anchored by Portland, Oregon. The organization was established as the Portland Trade Board in 1870, and was later known as the Portland Metropolitan Chamber, and the Portland Business Alliance.

Andrew Hoan is the chief executive officer.

== History ==
The organization was founded as the Portland Trade Board (also referred to as the Portland Board of Trade) in 1870. It was founded in part by William Reid, a very wealthy investor born in Glasgow, Scotland. On April 7, 1890, the organization was merged into the Portland Chamber of Commerce, which had been recently incorporated.

The organization would later be called the Portland Metropolitan Chamber from 1984 to 2001, and the Portland Business Alliance from 2001 to 2023, afterwards changing its name to the Portland Metro Chamber.
