= Doernbecher Children's Hospital =

- Oregon Health & Science University

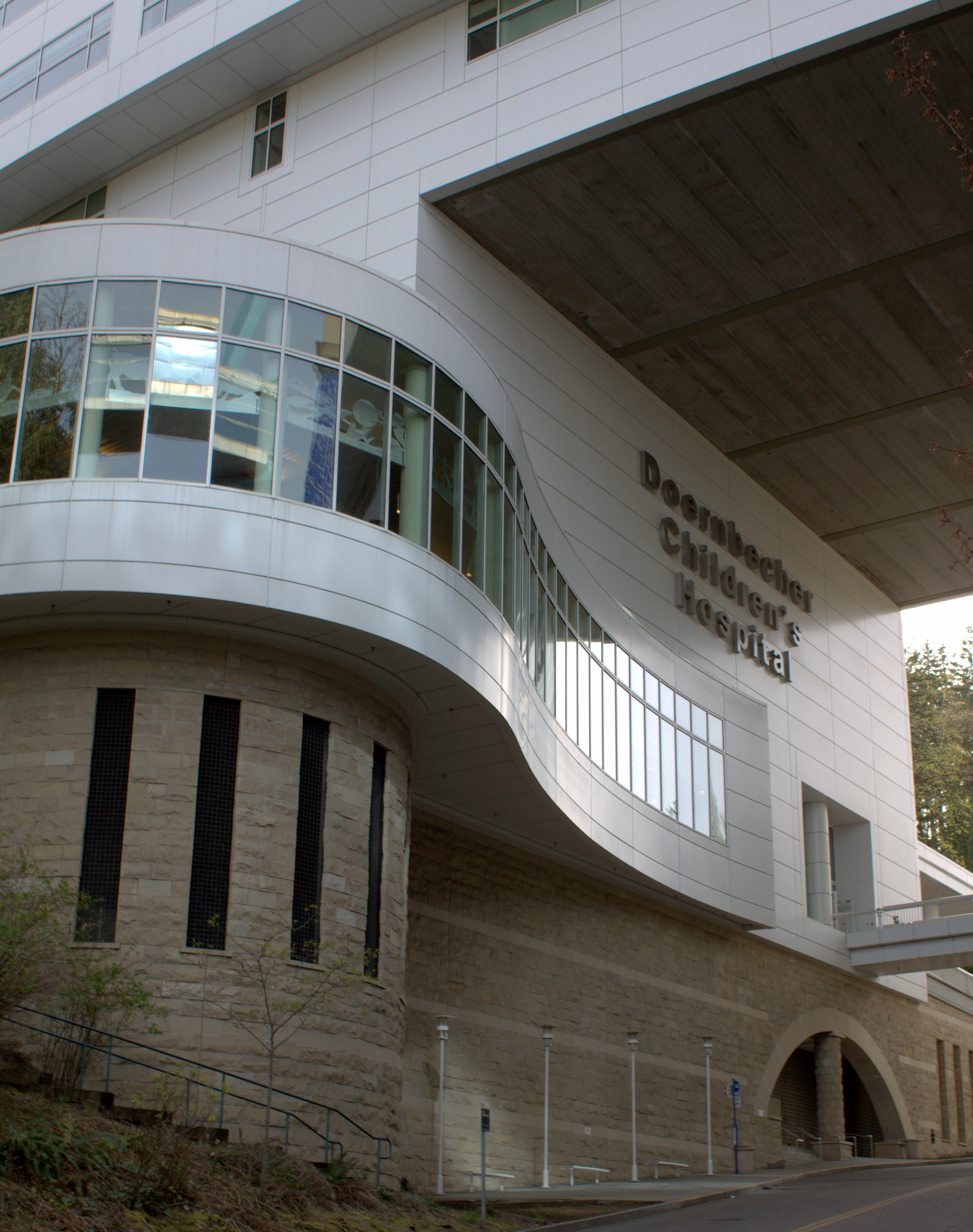
- Main entrance

Geography
- Location: Portland, Multnomah County, Oregon, United States
- Coordinates: 45.4998°N 122.6885°W

Organization
- Care system: Public
- Type: Pediatric

Links
- Website: ohsu.edu/doernbecher
- Lists: Hospitals in Oregon

Doernbecher Children's Hospital is an academic teaching children's hospital associated with Oregon Health & Science University located in Portland, Oregon. Established in 1926, it is the first full-service children's hospital in the Pacific Northwest, and provides full-spectrum pediatric care. Doernbecher Children's hospital is consistently ranked by U.S. News & World Report as one of the United States' top pediatric hospitals in multiple medical specialties.

== Rankings ==
In 2015–2016, the U.S. News & World Report was ranked nationally for the following medical specialties: #25 pediatric nephrology, #27 pediatric oncology, #31 neonatology, #34 pediatric neurology and neurosurgery, #40 pediatric pulmonology, #49 pediatric cardiology and heart surgery, and #49 pediatric urology.

== History ==
The hospital opened in 1926 on Portland's Marquam Hill. Doernbecher Children's Hospital developed the nation's first academic children's eye clinic in 1949 and Oregon's first neonatal intensive care center in 1968. In 1998, Doernbecher built a new state-of-the-art medical complex to replace the original hospital. The new facility was named as one of the major building engineering achievements of the last 100 years by the International Federation of Consulting Engineers in 2013. Designed by ZGF Architects, the 250,000-square-foot (23,000 m^{2}) building traverses a canyon with two streets running under the building.

== Namesake ==
Construction of the six-story hospital in 1925–26 was financed primarily by a donation from a charitable trust managed by the heirs of Frank Silas Doernbecher (1861–1921), a prominent Portland businessman who established the Doernbecher Manufacturing Company in Portland in 1900. The company was Portland's leading furniture manufacturer, and grew to become one of the country's largest furniture makers. Frank Doernbecher had stipulated in his will that the money, which amounted to $200,000, be given "to some charity for the benefit of the people of Oregon". The hospital's original name was the Doernbecher Memorial Hospital for Children, and from the start it was part of the University of Oregon Medical School, which in the 1970s became Oregon Health & Science University.

== See also ==
- Frank Silas Doernbecher House
