= Santa Clones =

Annual Christmas display in Portland, Oregon, U.S.

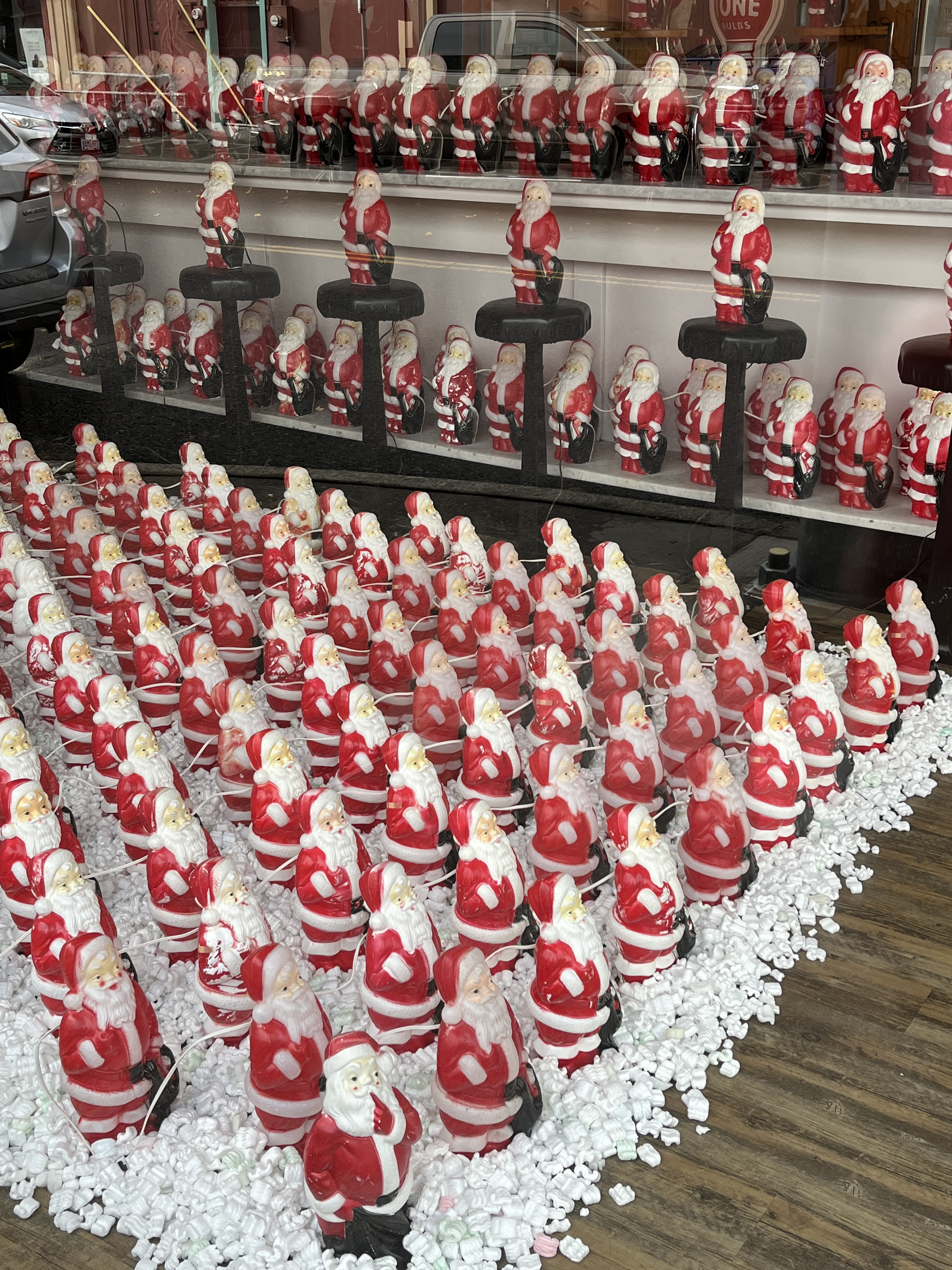
- Part of the display in 2024
- Artist: Chris Willis
- Location: Portland, Oregon, U.S.

Santa Clones is an annual Christmas display by Chris Willis in Portland, Oregon, United States. The display featured hundreds of Santa Claus statues and the location is different each year. Willis started the project in the early 2010s and the size of his collection of statues has grown over time.

== Description ==
The installation includes approximately 400 illuminating statues of Santa Claus made by Empire Plastics Corporation. Clues for the display's location are shared by the artist on social media. The display has been installed throughout Portland over the years, from downtown to the North, Northwest, and Southeast parts of the city.

== History ==
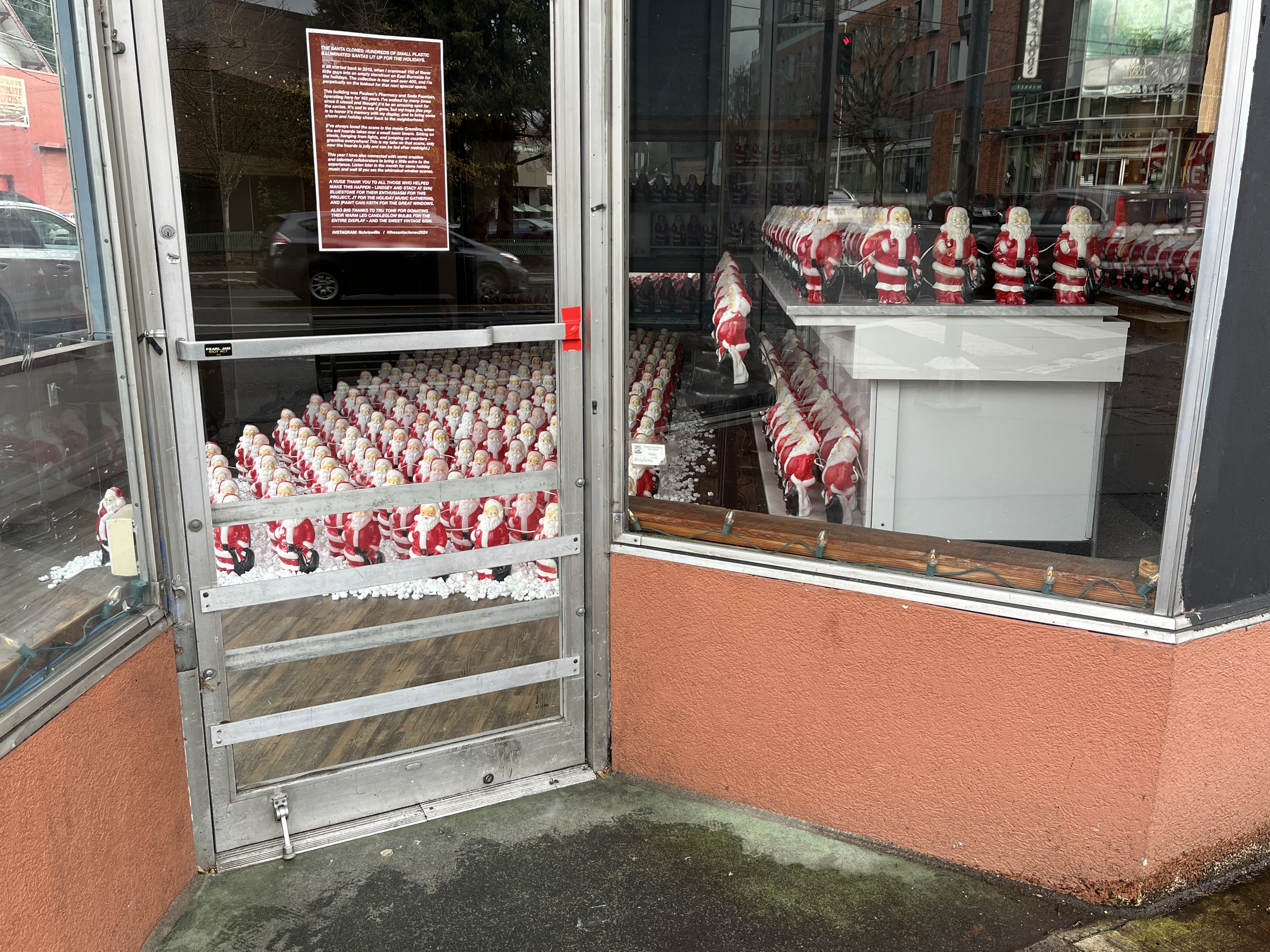
The display in 2024

Artist and designer Chris Willis installed the display for the first time in an empty storefront on East Burnside Street in 2010 or 2011, with approximately 150–200 statues. According to KOIN, Willis "was inspired to create an installation that resembled the Terracotta Warriors or Andy Warhol pop art – something with a lot of repetition". The display was not installed during 20122014, as Willis was unable to secure a space. Another year the display was installed in a friend's yard; for privacy purposes, Willis shared clues to find the statues instead of giving a specific address. The 2017 display was installed in downtown Portland and had 350 statues.

In 2020, the display in Westmoreland had expanded to approximately 400 statues. Willis added face masks to the statues during the COVID-19 pandemic. The 2021 display was installed in the Sellwood-Moreland neighborhood. A real estate company invited Willis to use an available space in Southeast Portland in 2022. In 2023, Willis added two large paintings by Terence Healy and multiple graphic prints to the display, which was installed in Southeast Portland. In 2024, Willis displayed approximately one third of the statues at a Gigantic Brewing Company location ahead of the main installation. The display was to commemorate the brewery's collaboration with Weird Portland United on the Santa Clones Winter Warmer beer. Willis's collection has grown to approximately 450 statues.

In 2025, the clues for finding the installation were haikus. In November 2026, Gigantic Brewing hosted a "Santa Clones Winter Warmer" party, featuring 150 Santa figurines, a disc jockey, ornament decorating, and stroopwafels. A special brew made in collaboration with Willis and Weird Portland United was available to help raise funds for the organization.

== See also ==
- Christmas in Portland, Oregon
- Culture of Portland, Oregon
