= Weird Portland United =

Nonprofit organization in Portland, Oregon, U.S.

- Formation: 2018; 8 years ago
- Founder: Brian Kidd
- Type: Nonprofit
- Location: Portland, Oregon, United States
- President: Christine Lassiter
- Website: weirdportlandunited.org

Weird Portland United is a nonprofit organization based in Portland, Oregon, United States. Brian Kidd, who is known as the Unipiper, founded the collective in 2018 in an effort to "Keep Portland Weird".

== History and activities ==
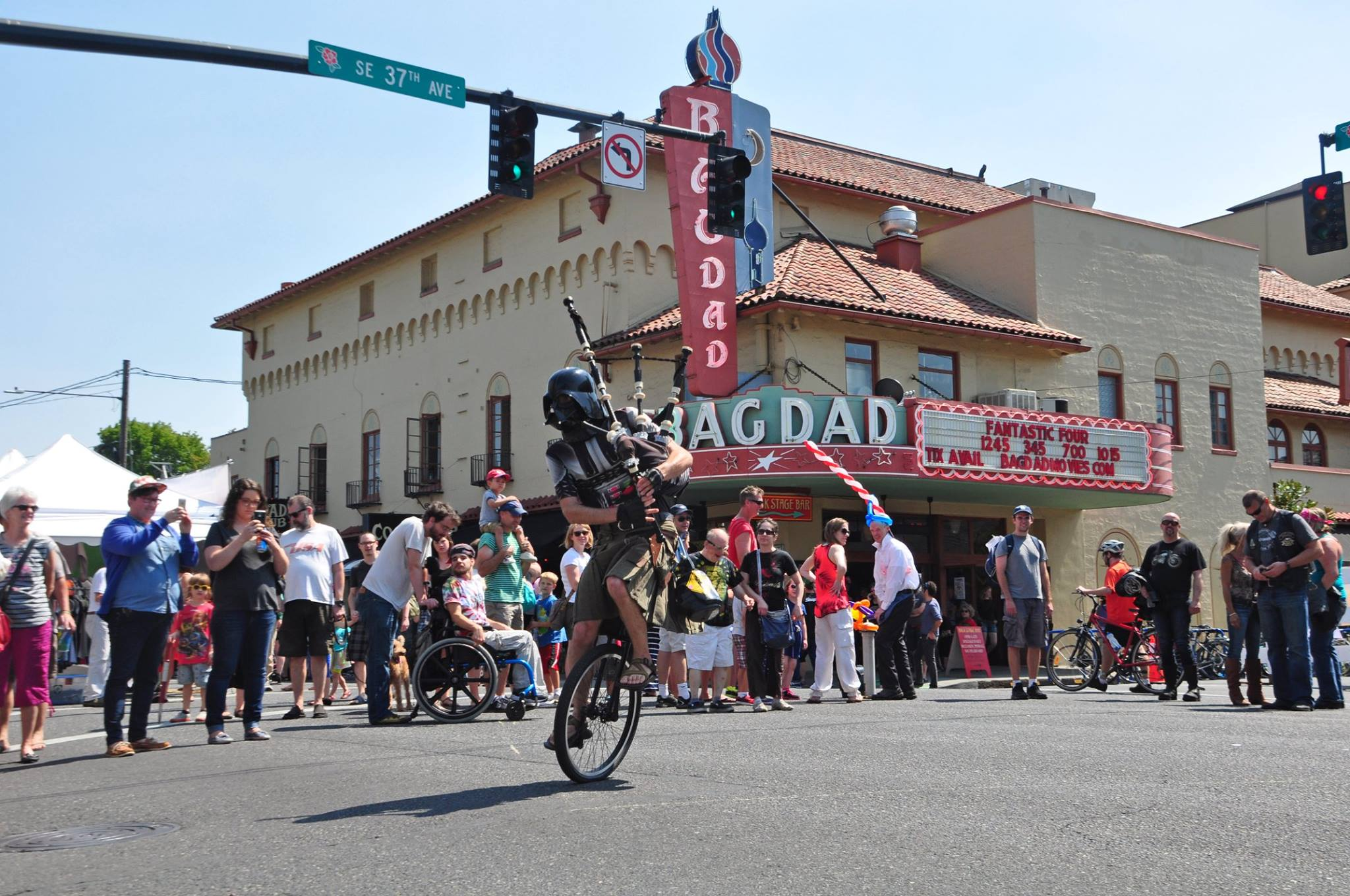
The organization Weird Portland United was founded by Brian Kidd (pictured performing as the Unipiper in front of Bagdad Theatre in southeast Portland's Richmond neighborhood in 2015) in 2018.

The nonprofit organization Weird Portland United (WPU) was founded by Brian Kidd (known as the Unipiper) in 2018 in an effort to "Keep Portland Weird". According to Willamette Week, WPU's mission "includes everything from awarding grants to emerging talent with an eye for eccentricity to acting as a clearinghouse for events and places with a flair for the bizarre". The newspaper said the organization also "aims to make our time stuck in traffic spiked with quirk by purchasing billboard space throughout the city and reserving them for weird-use only." The Oregonian has said WPU was established to "[raise] and [distribute] money to keep Portland's unique creative spirit alive and kicking". "Weirdo Memberships" cost $10 per month, or $100 per year, and the group also accepts donations from businesses and individuals.

WPU distributed $500 grants in 2020, during the COVID-19 pandemic. The Keep Weird Alive grant program offered assistance to artists. WPU and the Portland Street Art Alliance have collaborated on a series of murals.

=== Beer collaborations ===
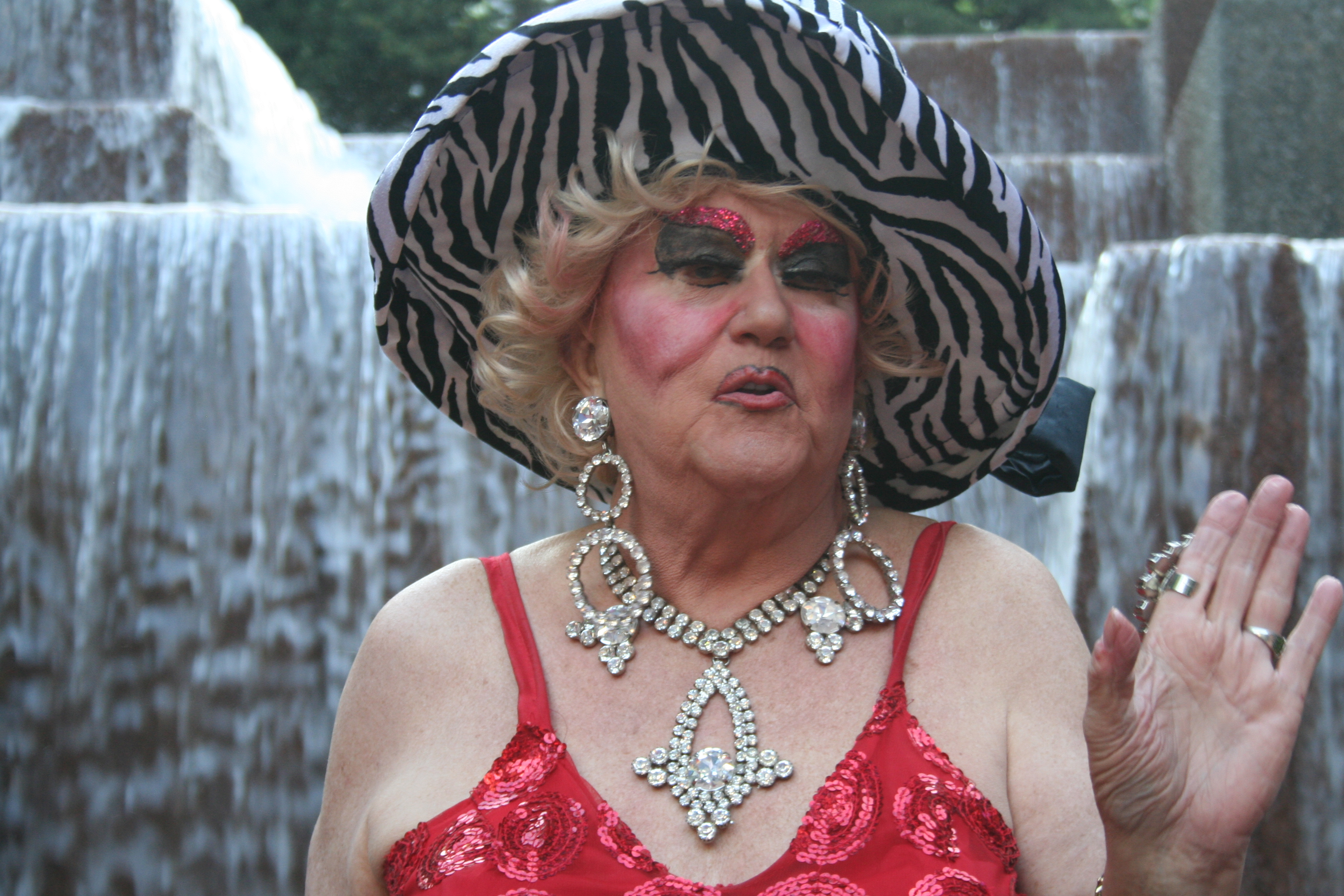
In 2023, Weird Portland United and Gigantic Brewing Company collaborated on a beer commemorating drag performer Darcelle XV (pictured in 2012), who also attended the first Weird Portland Gala in 2019.

WPU collaborated with Portland Brewing in 2019 to help with the organization's launch; proceeds from Unipiper Hazy IPA sales benefited WPU.

The organization has collaborated with Gigantic Brewing Company several times. In 2023, WPU and Gigantic collaborated on the Darcelle Blonde IPA, a beer commemorating drag performer Darcelle XV. A release party hosted by Poison Waters was held at Darcelle XV Showplace. In 2024, a beer commemorating Mill Ends Park was released with "Portland's shortest parade" for "the world's smallest park". Proceed from sales of the Portland Elvis Gold Lager benefited local Elvis impersonator John "Elvis" Schroder after his home eviction. WPU and Gigantic also partnered on the Santa Clones Winter Warmer beer in 2024. The beer commemorates Santa Clones, an annual Christmas display by Chris Willis.

=== Events ===
Among the organization's fundraising events is the Weird Portland Gala. The first Weird Portland Gala and Costume Party was held at Polaris Hall in North Portland in 2019. Hundreds of people attended, including former mayor Bud Clark and Darcelle XV.

WPU's first major public event, called Portland Weird Fest, was held at Oaks Amusement Park in 2024. The festival had activities for children, a beer garden, a costume contest, performance art, and vendors. The event was held at the same park in 2025. It featured a kids' rave and a chicken beauty contest. The 2026 event was held at Oaks Amusement Park on September 19 and included a beauty contest for chickens, an interpretive dance competition, live music, and a "rave" for children.

Gigantic has also hosted WPU socials.

=== Leadership ===
Kidd was the president of WPU in 2019. He has described the group as "the only 501-c-3 dedicated to keeping Portland weird". Christine Lassiter is the president as of 2024.

== See also ==
- Culture of Portland, Oregon
