= Unipiper =

American street performer (born 1983)

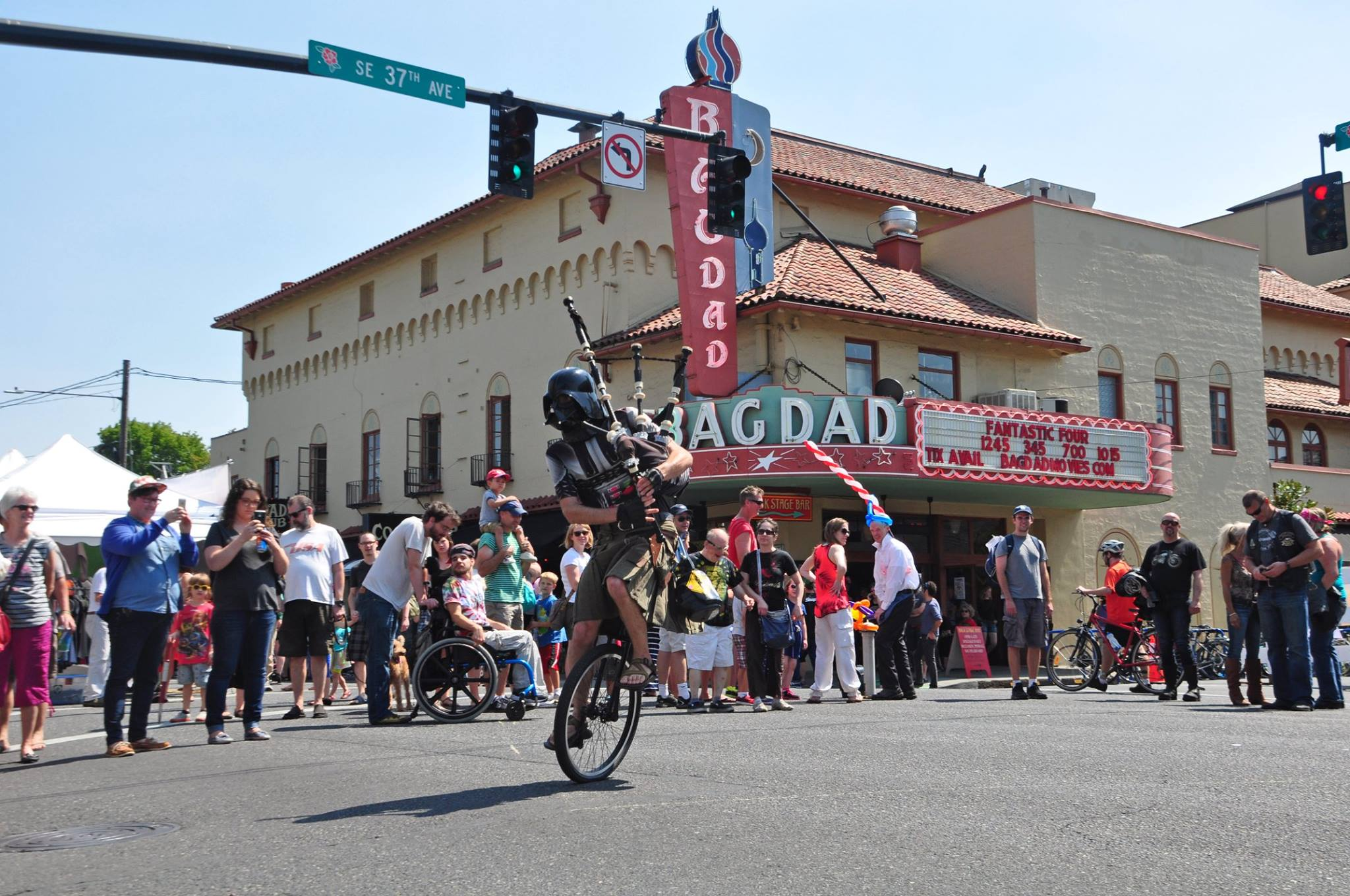
- The Unipiper entertaining a crowd gathered in front of the Bagdad Theater during the 2015 Hawthorne Street Fair in Portland, Oregon
- Born: Brian Kidd; 29 April 1983 (age 43); Colonial Heights, Virginia
- Website: www.theunipiper.com

The Unipiper (born Brian Kidd; April 29, 1983) is an American unicyclist, street performer, bagpiper, and internet celebrity based in Portland, Oregon.

== Life and career ==
Brian Kidd moved to Portland, Oregon, from North Carolina in 2007. The Oregonian newspaper wrote in 2017 that he came up with the act that he would later name the Unipiper "shortly before he moved to Portland", but developed it in Portland, where he was influenced by the city's receptiveness to quirky characters. He named his character the Unipiper when he moved to Portland.

The Unipiper is an American performance artist whose work regularly combines unicycling with playing the (sometimes flaming) bagpipes. The Unipiper first found Internet fame in 2012 when a video of him performing "The Imperial March" went viral. The video featured the Unipiper wearing a Darth Vader mask, while riding a unicycle and playing the bagpipes, and was subsequently featured on The Tonight Show with Jay Leno. His other mainstream media appearances have included America's Got Talent and Jimmy Kimmel Live!. He has since branched out into performances referencing non–Star Wars fictional elements, including Game of Thrones, Batman v Superman: Dawn of Justice, and Pokémon. His antics as Uncle Sam have attracted international attention.

In 2019, the Unipiper helped organize Weird Portland United, a nonprofit organization dedicated to promoting artists and creatives in the Portland metropolitan area. The Unipiper won in the Best Local Celebrity category of Willamette Week's annual 'Best of Portland' readers' poll in 2018. He won in the Best Local Celebrity and Best Mascot categories in 2020, ranked second in the Best Mascot category in 2022, and won in the Best Local Celebrity category in 2025.

In the 2026 film Wildwood, the Unipiper is seen cycling on the sidewalk in front of the main two characters, in his signature Darth Vader mask. The audio heard in the film was performed by the Unipiper himself.

== See also ==
- Culture of Portland, Oregon
- Keep Portland Weird
