= Horse rings in Portland, Oregon =

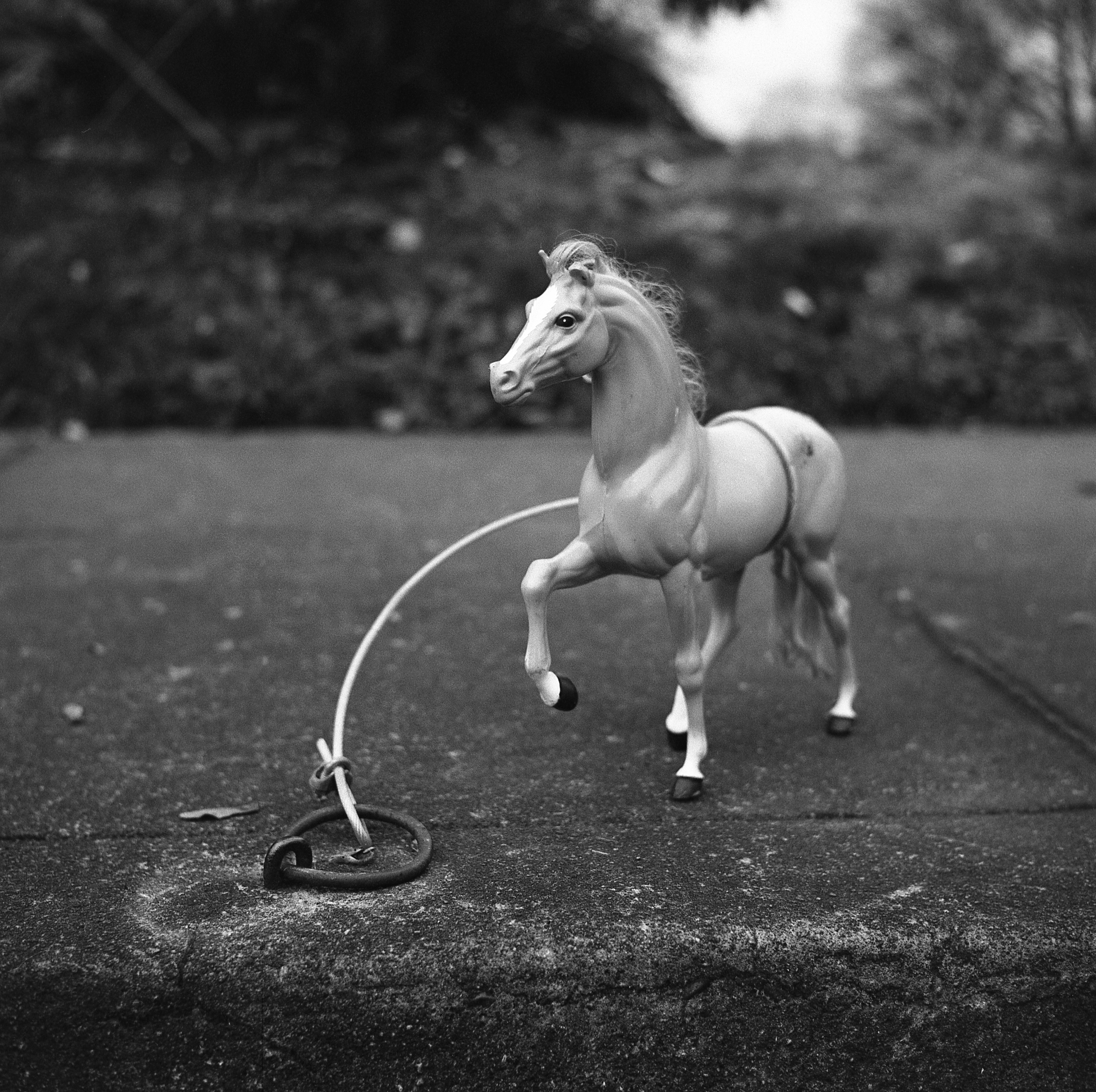
Toy horse tethered to a horse ring in Portland, Oregon in 2009

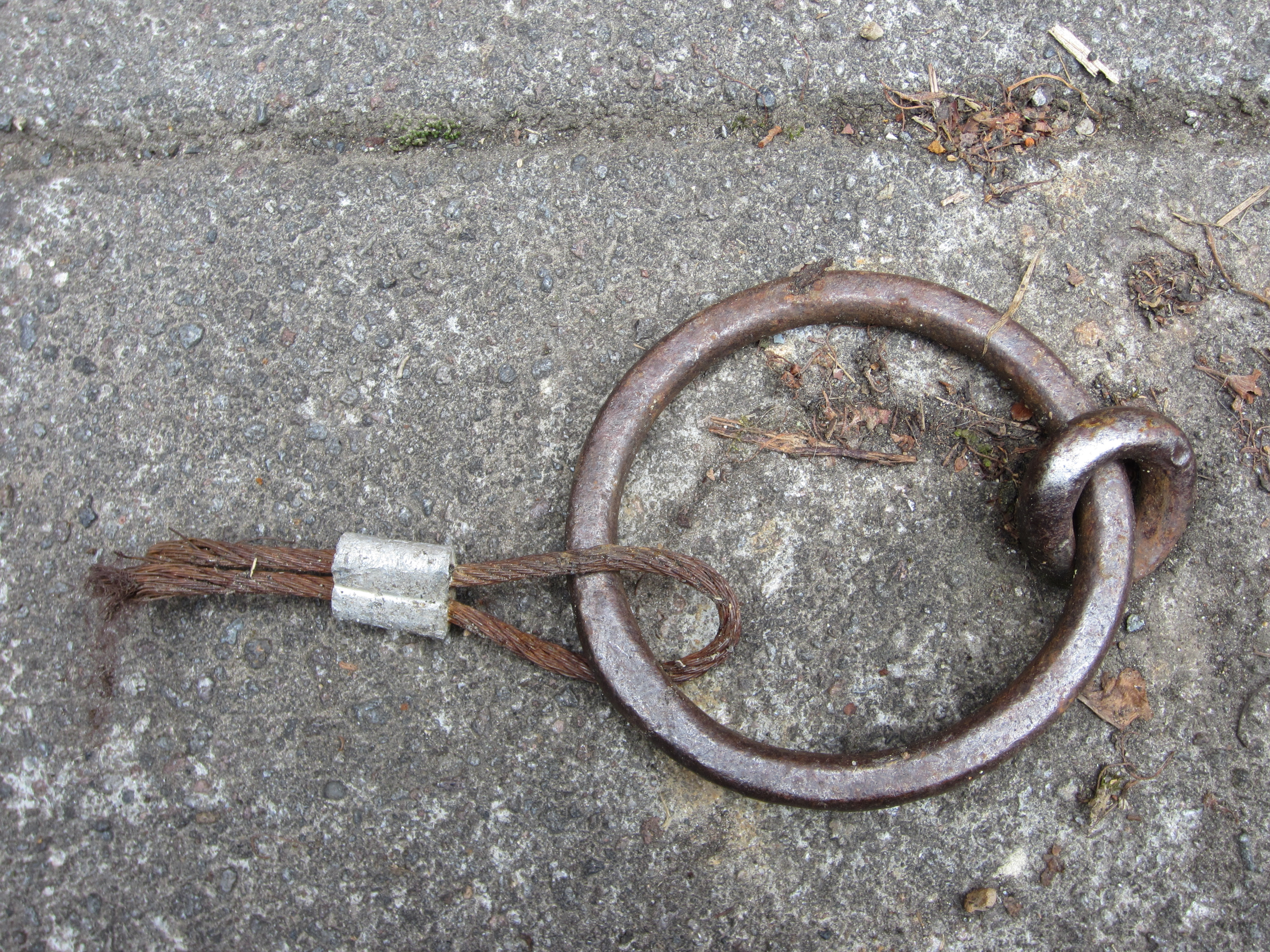
Horse ring near Southeast 37th and Belmont Street in 2012

Horse rings, remnants of a time when horses and horse-drawn vehicles provided the primary mode of transportation, can be found throughout Portland, Oregon, United States. They were removed from curbs and sidewalks for safety purposes until the late 1970s, when one Portland resident complained about the rings disappearing. Today, the city of Portland helps to preserve the rings by requiring them to be replaced following sidewalk construction or repair.

In recent years Portland residents have started tethering model horses to the rings, sparking interaction, and drawing attention to part of the city's history. The Horse Project, started by one resident of the Woodstock neighborhood in 2005, encourages participation in the urban art movement. The rings and art installations have become a tourist attraction.

== Background and history ==
Horse rings, often made of iron or brass, are remnants from the 1800s, when horses, and horse-drawn vehicles, provided the primary mode of transportation. In 1978, The Register-Guard suggested that the rings might only be as old as the early 1900s. The rings allowed residents to tether their horses to sidewalks.

Prior to the late 1970s, rings were removed during sidewalk reconstruction or repair for safety purposes. In 1978, after one Portland resident complained about the disappearance of rings, Connie McCready, then a City Commissioner, announced that rings could be replaced at a homeowner's request, likely for a fee of $5. Today, the city of Portland is committed to preserving the horse rings, which are reinstalled following curb and sidewalk construction or repair. An ordinance requires rings to be replaced at their original location (or "as close as practical"). Original street names are also reset or restamped into new concrete. The ring supply is monitored by the Bureau of Transportation. Portland is not the only city to preserve horse rings. City officials in Oak Harbor, Washington, confirmed that the last in a series of horse rings would be preserved during a February 2011 sidewalk construction project.

== Horse Project ==
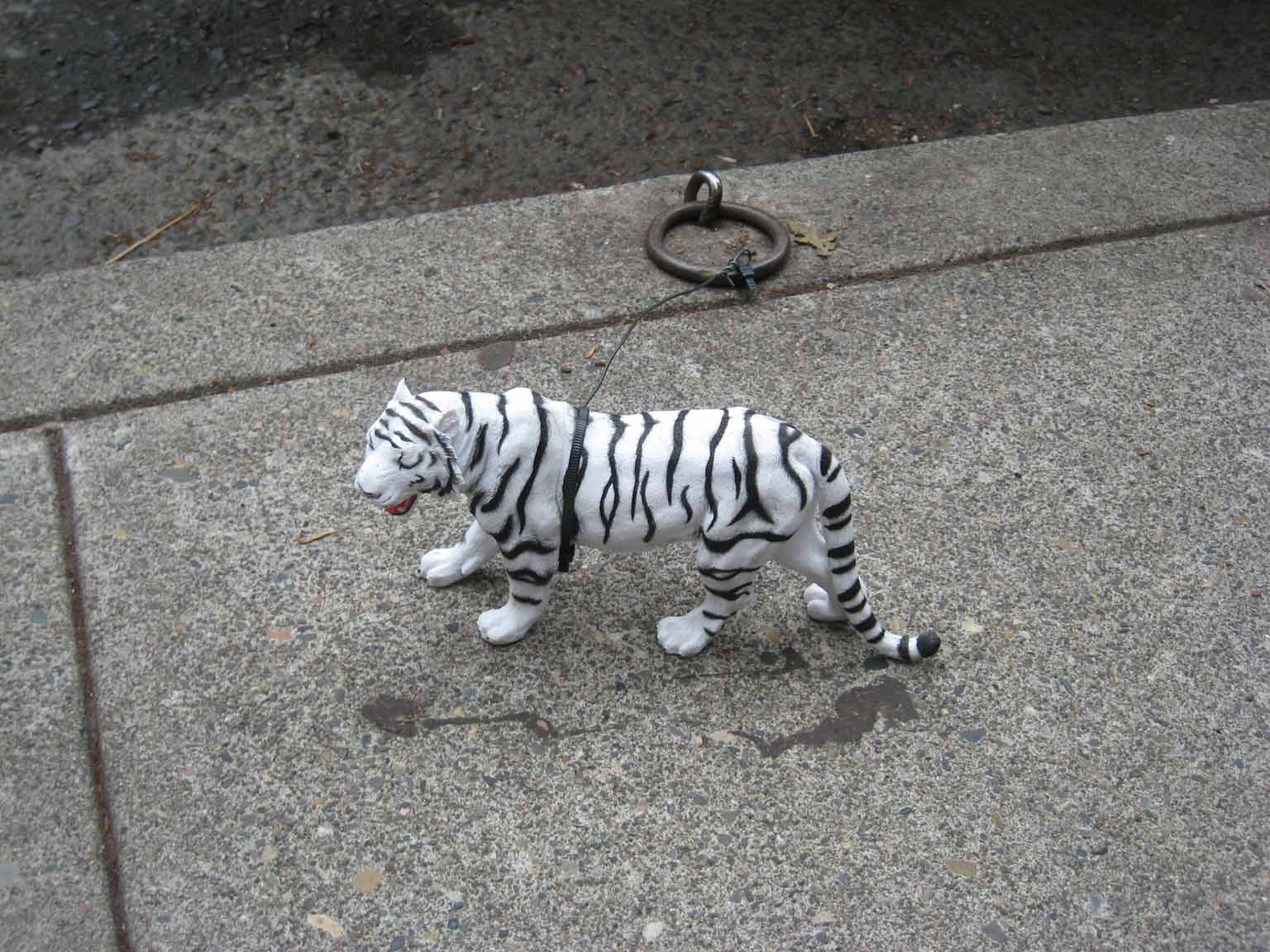
Tethered toy tiger in 2007

In September 2005, Woodstock resident Scott Wayne Indiana tied his first plastic toy horse to a horse ring located in the Pearl District. Of his attempt to draw attention to the rings, and to celebrate Portland's history, Indiana said: "I loved the rings, and felt that people just weren't noticing them. This was an attempt to shake people out of their routines and get them to notice their surroundings." Since then, the Horse Project has gained momentum and participation; horses can be found tied to rings throughout the city, especially in east Portland. The installations have sparked interaction with residents, who have left hay, lassoes, riders, saddles, water, wool blankets, and other "treats" for the horses. Horses are often defaced or go missing.

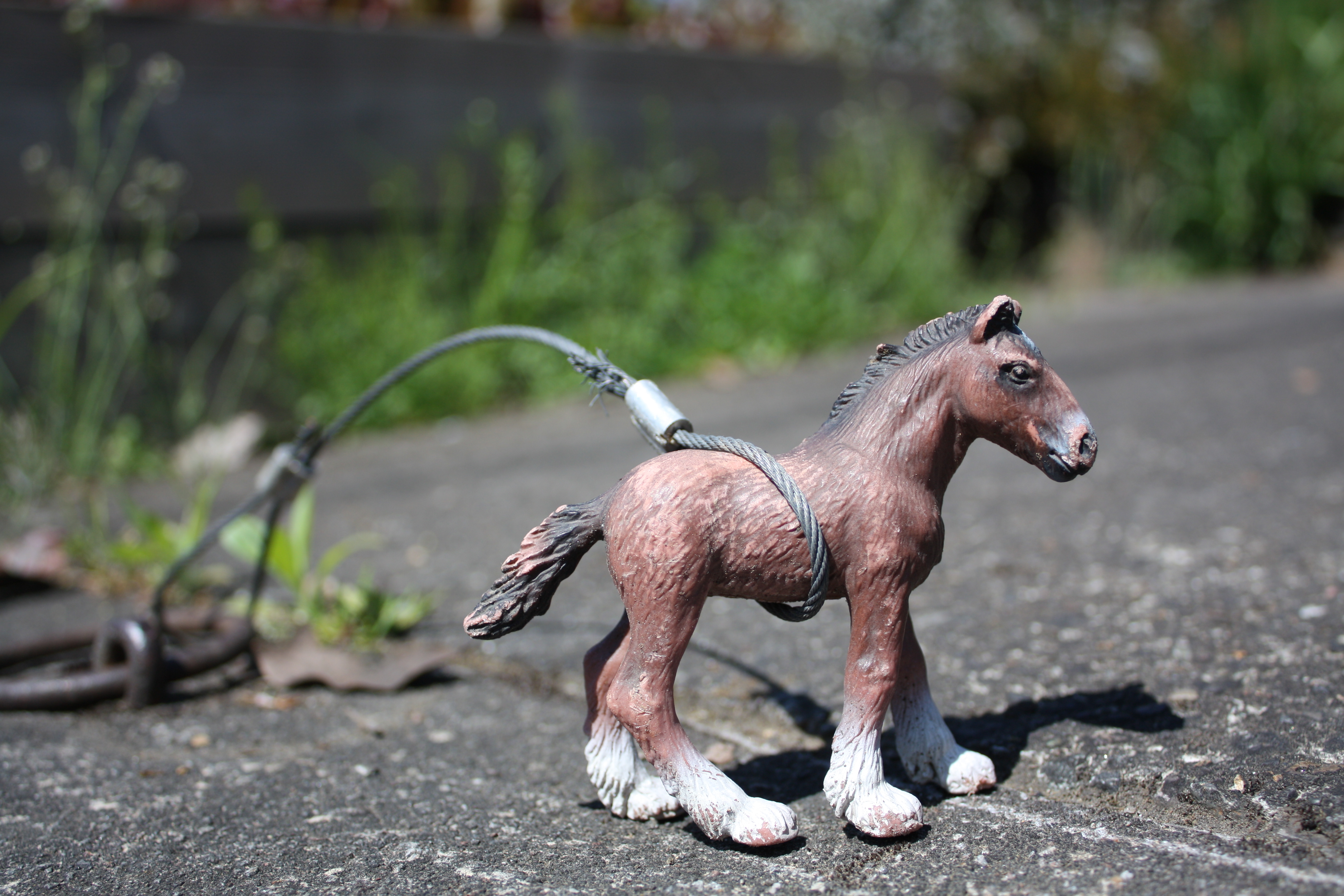
Tethered toy horse in 2009

The Horse Project has an official website, which encourages participation, and offers instructions for tethering. The project accepts donations and volunteer support. Participants considered selling kits for consumers interested in tethering horses. One Portland resident has reportedly installed more than 150 horses. Horses are the most frequent animal to be tied to rings, but pigs, dolls, and other animals have also appeared throughout the city.

Willamette Week included the Horse Project in its Best of Portland list for 2006 under the category Best Horse of a Different Color. In 2007, The Oregonian's Anna Griffin mentioned the project in an article about the "Keep Portland Weird" slogan, writing: "The 'Horse Project' comes up anytime the subject of Portland weirdness arises." Project participation continues despite Indiana's move out of state in 2008. In 2011, the documentary film It's a Ring Thing: The Portland Horse Project premiered at NW Documentary's Homegrown DocFest. In 2012, The Oregonian highlighted the engagement of a couple who attribute the start of their relationship to a horse ring installation in the Pearl District.

The city's "Sustainable Stormwater Management" calendar for 2012 called the installations "stormwater art", which "highlights healthy watersheds and demonstrates that stormwater is a resource and an asset". The horse rings, and urban art installations, have become a tourist attraction.

== See also ==
- Culture of Portland, Oregon
- Equestrian statue
- Horses in art
- Model horse showing
- Street art
- Mounting block
