= Keep Portland Weird =

Popular slogan throughout Portland, Oregon and surrounding areas

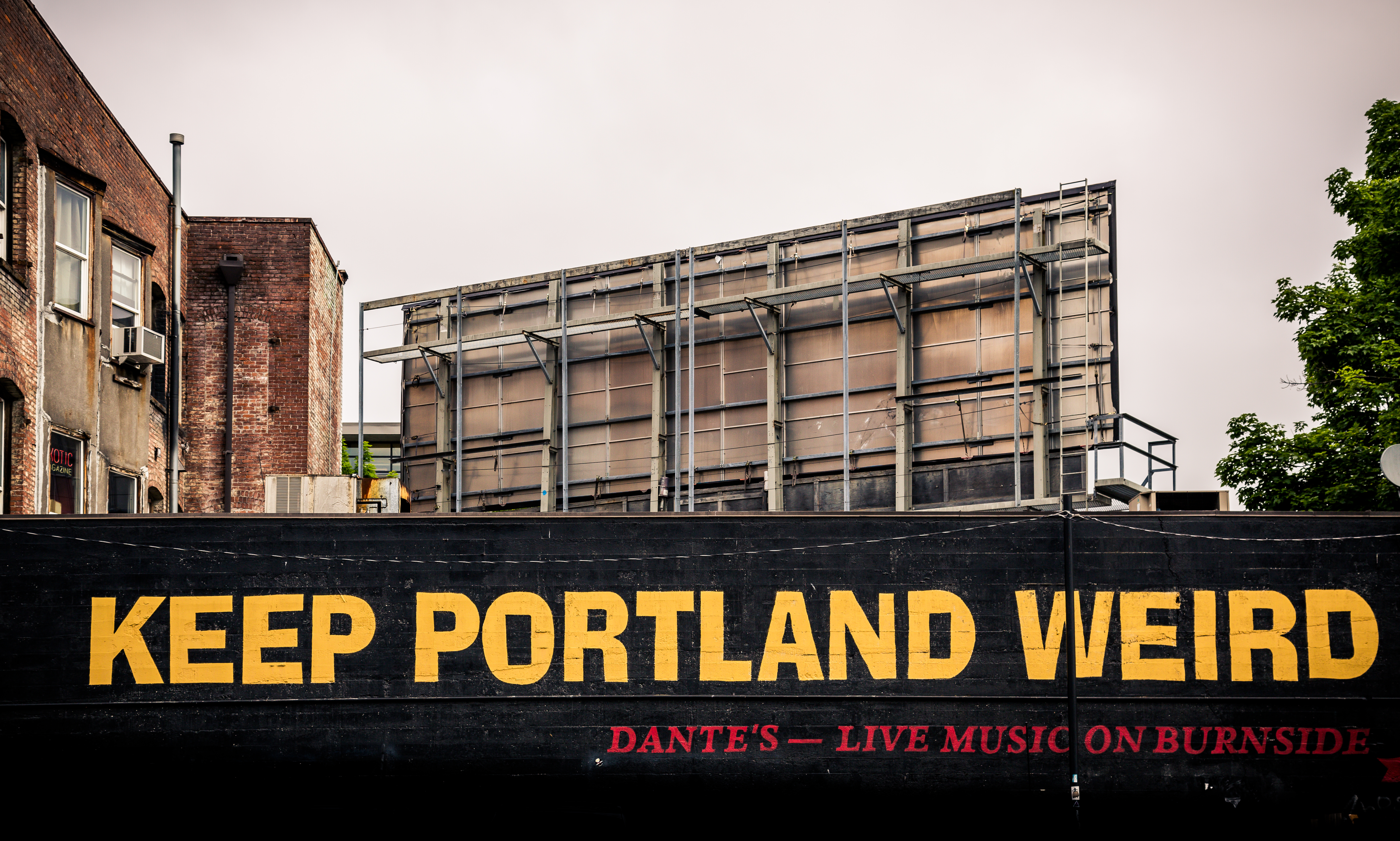
"Keep Portland Weird" on a building in Old Town

"Keep Portland Weird" is a popular slogan that appears on bumper stickers, signs, and public buildings throughout Portland, Oregon and its surrounding metro area. It originated from the "Keep Austin Weird" slogan and was originally intended to promote local businesses, though it has since evolved into an all-encompassing slogan that secondarily promotes individuality, expressionism, local art, as well as atypical lifestyle choices and leisure activities. The slogan frequently inspires articles and debate that attempt to quantify the exact level to which Portland is considered weird, unusual or eccentric. It has been called the unofficial motto of Portland, as well as the informal mantra of the city's residents.

The slogan has also been used for a number of years in the Isle of Portland in Dorset, England. Here a landscape heavily changed through extensive quarrying combined with the social and architectural legacy of a long military presence has created a unique environment which has led to the adoption of the "Weird" tag and "Keep Portland Weird" bumper stickers are frequently seen on local vehicles.

== History ==
The slogan was created with the intention of supporting local businesses and small business owners. It was based on the Keep Austin Weird organization and slogan in Austin, Texas, and was brought to Portland in 2003 by Music Millennium owner Terry Currier after he learned of the movement in Austin. Currier, whom The Oregonian called "the father of Portland's weird movement", trademarked the phrase "Keep Portland Weird" in 2007 and printed the first bumper stickers, selling more than 10,000 by the end of the year. As of 2011, more than 18,000 bumper stickers with the slogan were said to exist, according to accounts from local media, as well as a painting on the side of a building across from Voodoo Doughnut in a high foot-traffic area of Old Town.

== Weirdness ==
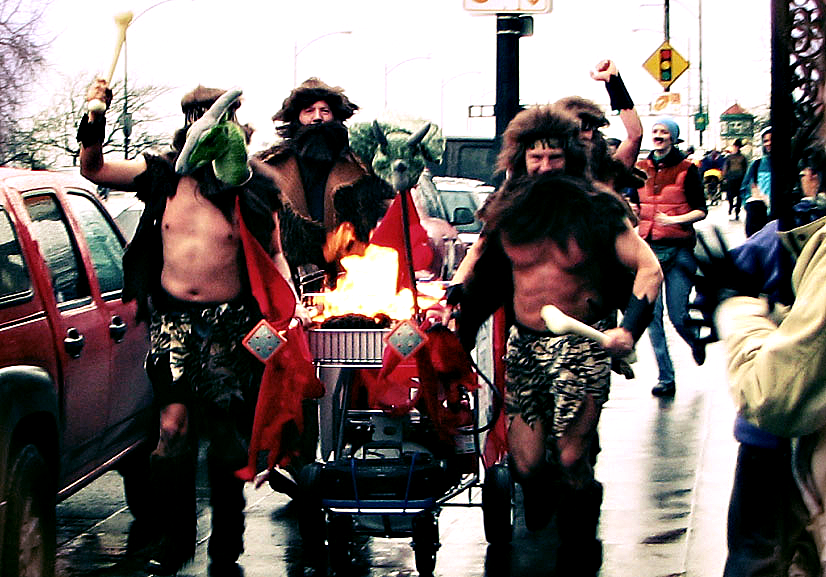
Contestants in the Portland Urban Iditarod

In 2014 an Austin blog put together an infographic that compared Austin and Portland in a series of categories to try to decide which city was "weirder". Twelve different categories were used, including "Most Tattooed US Cities" and "America's Craziest Cities". From this comparison, Portland was the clear winner taking first in nine of the twelve categories.

The Oregonian newspaper developed a weirdness scale in response to the slogan and Portland ranked 11th, with high rates of hiking, hunting, and hybrid car ownership. The most "normal" cities in the U.S. were in the Midwest, and Salt Lake City and San Francisco were among the weirdest. In comparing Portland to New York City and San Francisco, Lonely Planet writer Becky Ohlsen said "Something about how cheap and isolated Portland is, allows oddballs to explore odd behavior without being squished by economics or the harsh judgment of fashion people."

Items mentioned as illustrating the residents' eccentricities include the Voodoo Doughnut shop, the World Naked Bike Ride, the Zoobomb cycling events, artist Adam Kuby's (now removed) Portland Acupuncture Project, the popularity of yarn bombing, the Portland Urban Iditarod, and the now-defunct Velveteria Museum of Velvet Paintings and 24 Hour Church of Elvis. Another is the "Horse Project". The first "Keep Portland Weird festival" was held in October 2007 at the Central Library, and among the participants were the Portland Ukulele Association, Free Geek, and the Portland Area Robotics Society. Another took place in November 2009.

Portland's city commission government—a type of municipal governance now rare in the U.S.—has been described as another aspect of its weirdness, compounded by the various peculiarities of its implementation.

Portland is the largest city in the U.S. which does not fluoridate its water. Residents have declined attempts to institute municipal fluoridation four times: First in 1956, then in 1962, 1980, and 2013. At the September 2012 Portland City Council meeting after a year of pro-fluoridation lobbying efforts, the council unanimously approved implementation despite strong opposition by attendees. The matter was quickly deferred to the next election where fluoridation lost by 40% supporting to 60% opposing largely on concerns of adding fluoridation chemicals to one of the nation's purest water supplies.

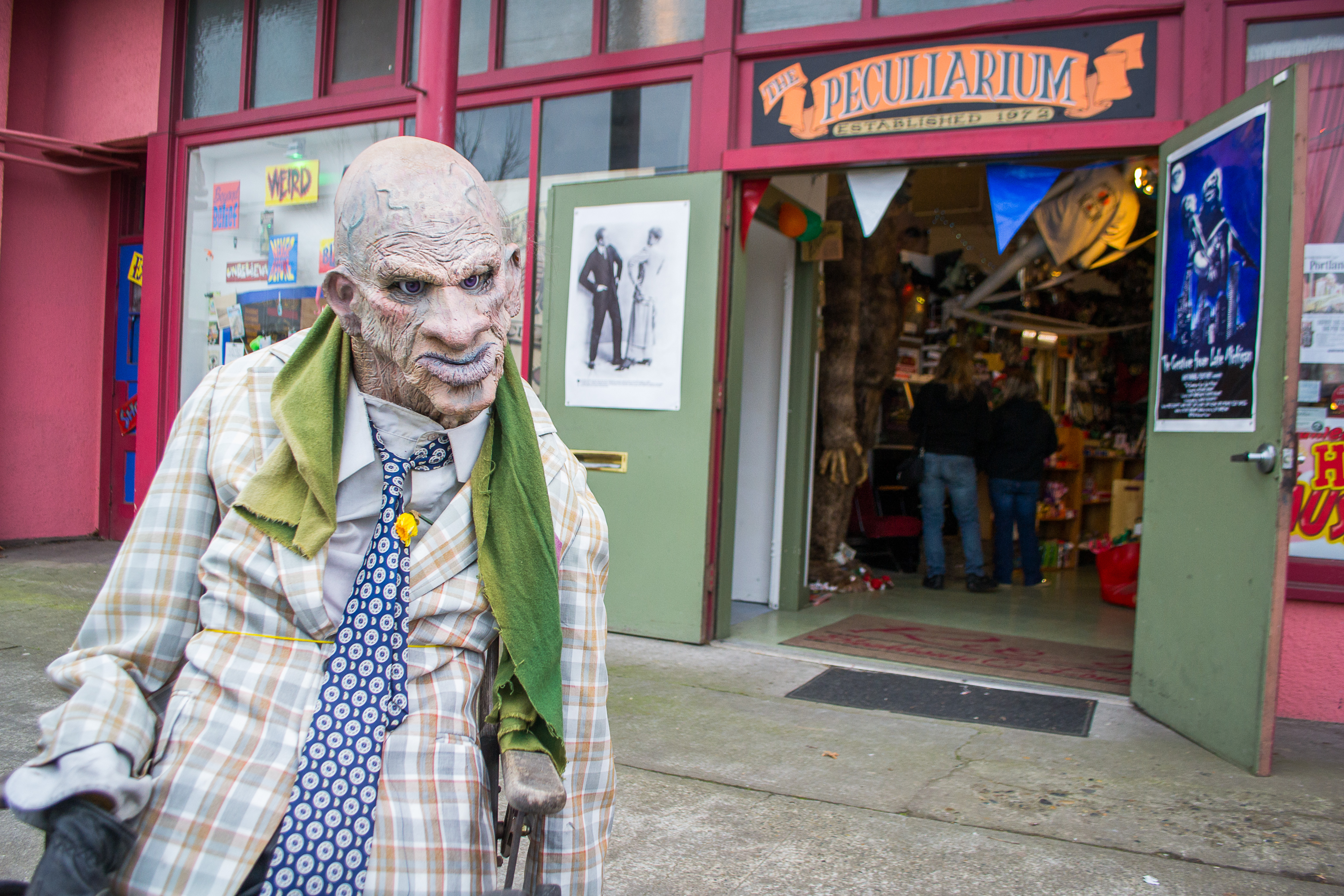
The Peculiarium

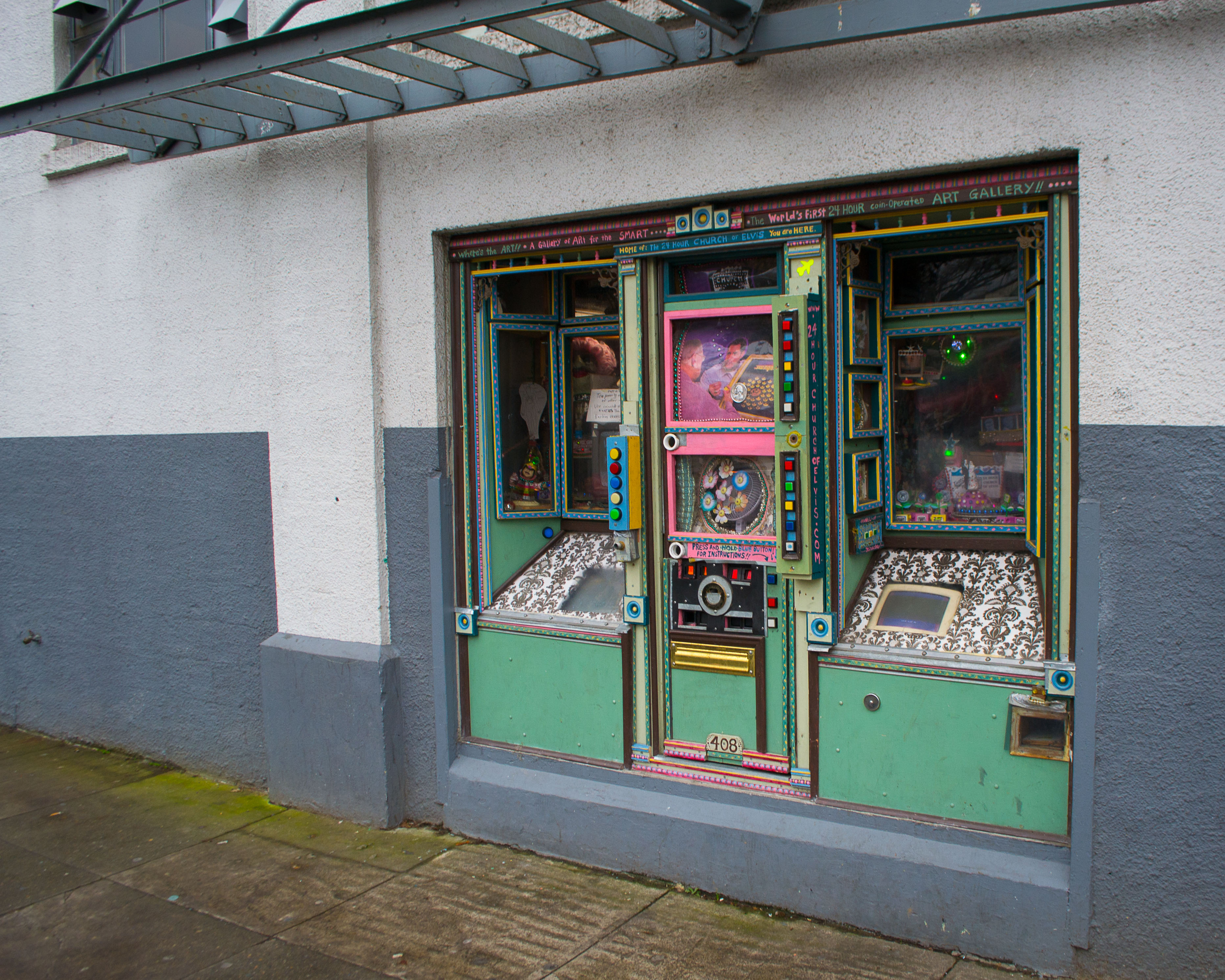
24 Hour Church of Elvis

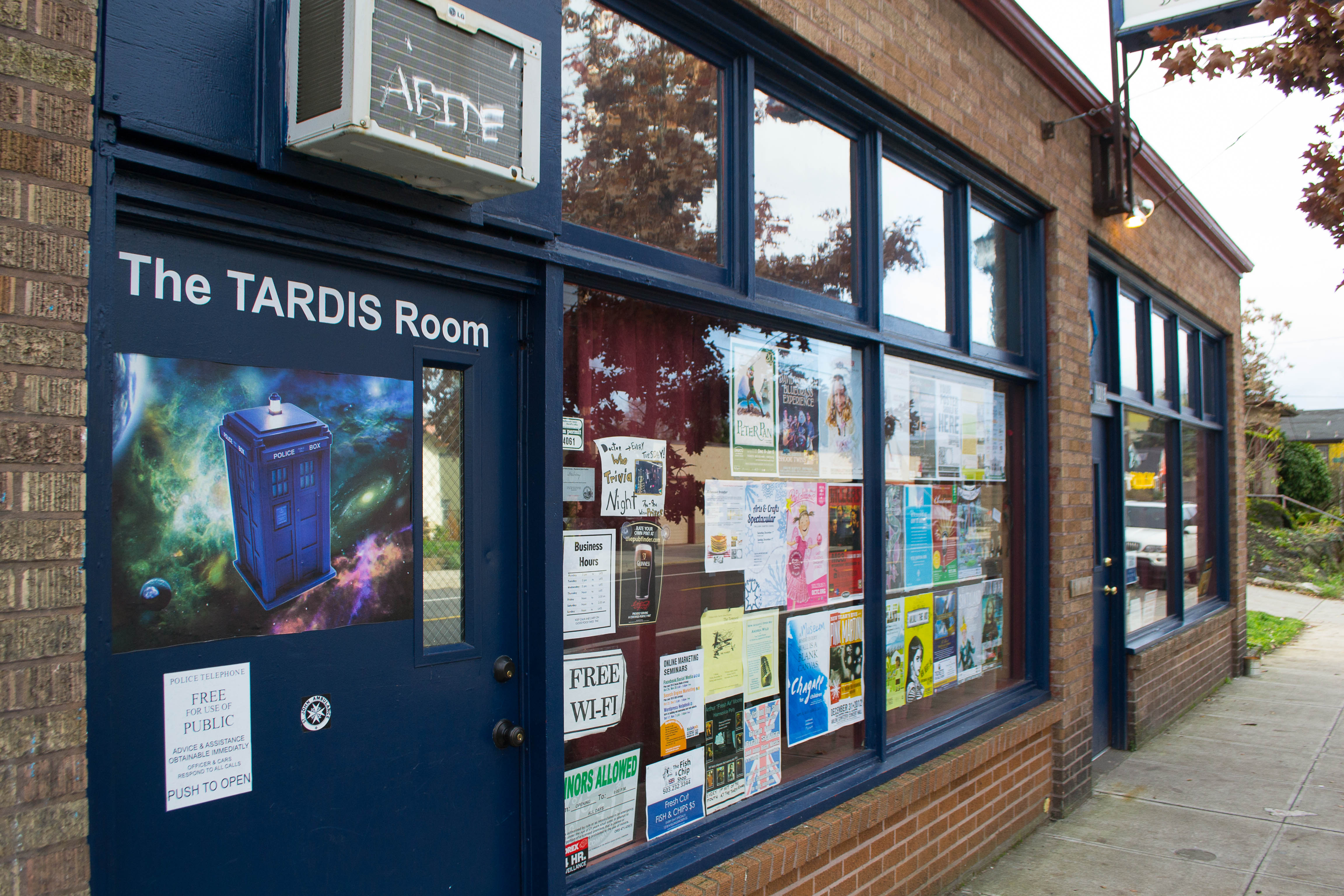
The TARDIS Room

== Controversies ==
The slogan "Keep Portland Weird" has created controversy and been imitated with slogans such as "Keep Portland Beered" and others. Also suggested is that Portland might not have been originally weird, but the campaign leads to a new weirdness among some Portlanders. Not all citizens view the campaign in a positive light. Some have advanced the idea that Portland's weirdness is an excuse for the younger generation to be underachievers. Also some citizens claim that the intended effect of the campaign—economic stimulation for local businesses—has not achieved the desired results.

In early 2011, the "Keep Portland Weird" slogan was used in a debate about Portland's refusal to join the federal government's Joint Terrorism Task Force. Portland originally opted out of the task force in 2005 over concerns for civil liberties. Recent potential threats have prompted local officials to reconsider joining the task force. Those opposed to joining the task force adopted the "Keep Portland Weird" slogan to point out that Portland was different from other cities and should continue to opt out of the task force and not join with other government forces. Opposing citizens felt joining the task force could have potentially affected Portland's traditionally progressive stance on civil liberties.

== See also ==
- Californication – anti-development sentiment to keep Portland's unique character
- Culture of Portland, Oregon
- Heart in Oregon – common bumpersticker
- Portlandia – lampoons the weirdness of Portland
- Grimm – police procedural fantasy television drama series set in Portland
- Coraline's Curious Cat Trail – art installation featuring a sculpture named "Keep Portland Weird"
- Keep Louisville Weird
- Weird Portland United
