= I Love New York =

Slogan and song promoting New York state

- Current owner: NY Department of Economic Development
- Produced by: New York State Department of Commerce / Milton Glaser (designer)
- Country: United States
- Introduced: July 15, 1977
- Registered as a trademark in: 73758742
- Website: www.iloveny.com

I Love New York (stylized I ❤ NY) is a slogan, a logo, and a song that are the basis of an advertising campaign developed by the marketing firm Wells, Rich, and Greene under the directorship of Mary Wells Lawrence used since 1977 to promote tourism in the state of New York. The service marked logo, owned by the New York State Department of Economic Development, appears in souvenir shops and brochures throughout the state, some licensed, many not.

"I Love New York" is the official state slogan of New York. The logo was designed by graphic designer Milton Glaser in 1976 in the back of a taxi and was drawn with red crayon on scrap paper. The original drawing is held in the Museum of Modern Art in Manhattan. The song was written by Steve Karmen and its copyright was donated by him to the state.

== Logo ==
The logo consists of the capital letter I, followed by a red heart symbol (❤), below which are the capital letters N and Y, set in the rounded slab serif typeface American Typewriter.

In 1976, William S. Doyle, Deputy Commissioner of the New York State Department of Commerce hired advertising agency Wells Rich Greene to develop a marketing campaign for the State of New York. Doyle also recruited Milton Glaser, a productive graphic designer to work on the campaign and create a design based on Wells Rich Greene's advertising campaign. Glaser's initial sketch to accompany the agency's "I Love New York" slogan was conceived in a taxi. It comprised the letter I and a heart shape, followed by NY, all on the same line. As the idea developed, he decided to stack the I and the heart shape on a line above the NY characters, later stating that he may have been "subliminally" influenced by Robert Indiana's LOVE pop art image.

Glaser expected the campaign to last only a couple months and did the work pro bono. The innovative pop-style icon became a major success and has continued to be sold for years. In the popular mind (though this was not the original intention), the logo has become closely associated with New York City, and the placement of the logo on plain white T-shirts readily sold in the city has widely circulated the appearance of the image, making it a commonly recognized symbol. Glaser's original concept sketch and presentation boards were donated by Doyle to the permanent collection of the Museum of Modern Art, New York. The logo and Glaser's sketch were included in MoMA's 2025 exhibition Pirouette: Turning Points in Design, a collection of "widely recognized design icons [...] highlighting pivotal moments in design history," such as the Bean Bag chair, the Sony Walkman portable cassette player, and the NASA Worm insignia.

The image became especially prominent following the September 11 attacks on the city, which created a sense of unity among the populace. Many visitors to the city following the attacks purchased and wore the shirts bearing the "I Love New York" logo as a sign of their support. Glaser created a modified version to commemorate the attacks, reading "I Love NY More Than Ever", with a little black spot on the heart symbolizing the World Trade Center site. The black spot approximates the site's location on lower Manhattan Island. The poster was printed in the New York Daily News and was a fundraiser for New York charities supporting those affected by the attacks. Added text at the bottom encouraged people to "Be generous. Your city needs you. This poster is not for sale."

== New York State anthem ==
"I Love New York"
- State anthem of New York
- Lyrics: Steve Karmen, 1977
- Music: Steve Karmen, 1977
- Published: 1977
- Adopted: 1980

"I Love New York" was written and composed by Steve Karmen in 1977 as part of the advertising campaign. In 1980, Governor Hugh Carey declared it as New York's state anthem, although not officially enacted into law. In a move that was remarkable for Karmen, who is well known for retaining the publishing rights to his songs, he gave the rights to the song to the state for free.

Karmen wrote a new verse for the song in 2020, during the height of the COVID-19 pandemic in New York City to emphasize the city's resilience. However, it was never commercially recorded nor used.

=== Lyrics ===
Original 1977 lyrics:

I love New York
('cause it's so exciting!)
I love New York
(And there's no place like it.)
I love New York
('cause it's exciting!)
I love New York
(And there's no place like it.)

There isn't another like it
no matter where you go.
And nobody can compare it.
It's greater than place and show.
You know...
New York is special,
You know, New York is different!
'Cause there's no place else on earth quite like New York!

Additional verse written in 2020:

Whenever we face a crisis
New Yorkers find a way
When everyone works together
New Heroes Everyday
New York is family
You know nothing beats family And we'll win this fight together
'Cause we're New York
That's why I Love New York

== Imitations ==
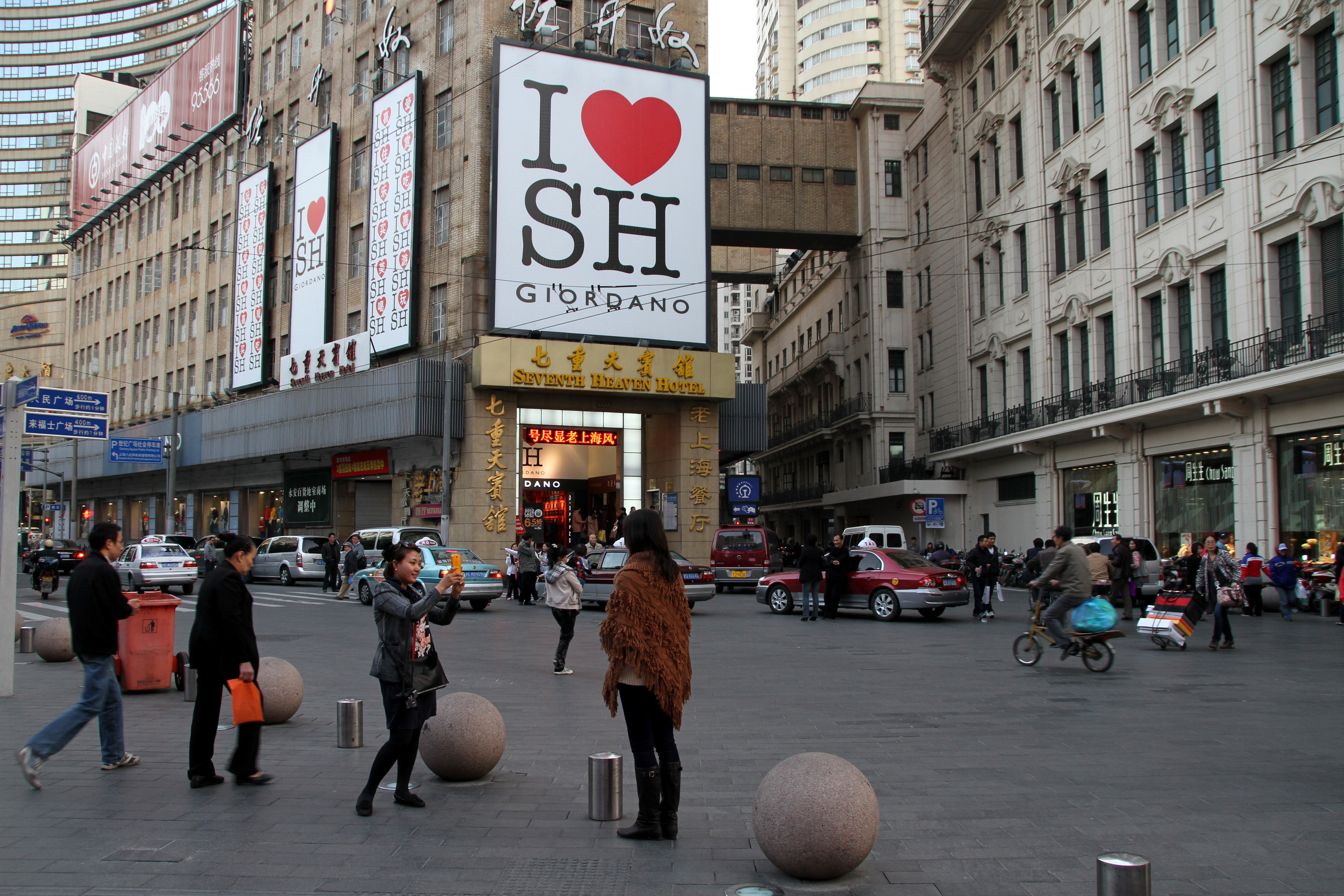
An I ❤️ SH sign in Shanghai, China in the style of "I love NY"

Since the launch of the campaign, many imitations and parodies have appeared. Facetious expressions beginning "I heart..." are based on a literal reading of the logo (as in the 2004 independent film I Heart Huckabees).

"We ❤️ NYC" variant from 2023

New York state government has repeatedly attempted to uphold its trademark; by 2005, the state had filed nearly 3,000 objections against imitators, and 100 "trademark objections and cease-and-desist letters" were filed in 2012 alone. Some objections have been ruled void, such as when a court concluded in 1980 that the producers of Saturday Night Live did not infringe on the copyrights of the "I Love New York" campaign with its "I Love Sodom" skit, ruling instead that it was a parody.

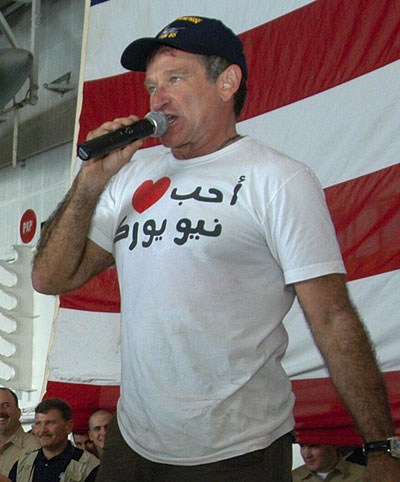
Actor Robin Williams wearing a T-shirt with the logo translated into Arabic (2003)

In March 2023, as part of a revitalisation campaign after the COVID-19 pandemic, the Partnership for New York City introduced "We ❤️ NYC", a "modern twist" on the logo designed by a team led by Graham Clifford, which was posted throughout the city. The text changes the state abbreviation "NY" to the city abbreviation "NYC", and the pronoun from "I" to "We". The graphic uses a sans-serif font in all caps, in which the heart symbol has shading and is larger and placed further off-center than in the "I ❤ NY" graphic. Media reported criticism of both the slogan as unoriginal and the design as inelegant.

== See also ==
- Friday the 13th Part VIII: Jason Takes Manhattan – horror film criticized for using the "I Love New York" logo
- Heart in Oregon
- Virginia Is for Lovers
- I Love L.A.
- I Love New York 355 at The Glen
- Love (image)
- Tourism in New York City
