= Heart in Oregon =

Heart in Oregon is an emblem that symbolizes Oregonians’ love for their home state. It consists of a green heart, surrounded by a black border shaped as the state of Oregon. The Oregonian wrote, "Chris Bucci has launched a one-man enterprise out of his love of Oregon — stickers with green hearts".

Launched in 2003 as a bumper sticker, and inspired by the famous I ♥ NY symbol, the sticker was originally rectangular in shape and the heart in the design was red. After experimenting with different sizes and colors, the sticker took its present form using a green heart, and it then achieved success. Described by The Portland Upside as "the Heart in Oregon sticker-turned-emblem that has popped up everywhere on auto bumpers, community news boards and skin", the newspaper noted that some people have had the emblem tattooed onto their bodies, and that over 250,000 of the stickers have been distributed.

The Democratic Party of Oregon adopted the emblem for T-shirts and buttons used at the 2008 Democratic National Convention in Denver. The emblem "reflects our shared appreciation for Oregon's beauty, entrepreneurial spirit and environmental leadership" according to the state party.

In autumn 2010, a corn maze was created in Portland, featuring the Heart in Oregon emblem.

== See also ==
- Keep Portland Weird
