= Adam Kuby =

American sculptor, visual artist and landscape designer

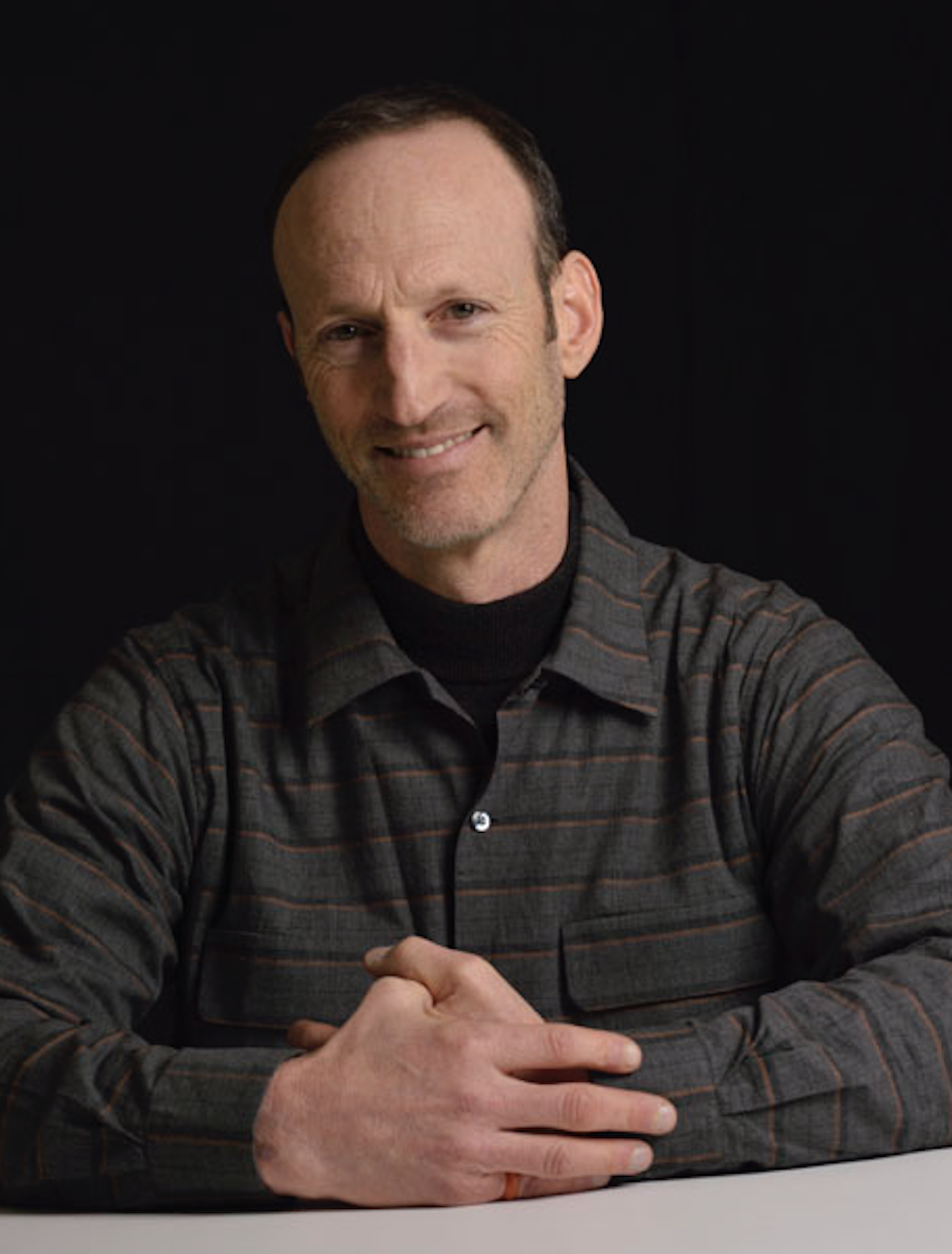
- Born: 1961 (age 64–65); Philadelphia, Pennsylvania, US
- Education: University of Pennsylvania University of North Carolina
- Occupation: Artist

Adam Kuby (born 1961) is an American sculptor, visual artist and landscape designer, focusing on large-scale public art commissions and environmental art installations.

== Early life and education ==
Kuby grew up in Philadelphia and is primarily based in Portland, Oregon. He has a Bachelor of Arts in Environmental Design from the University of Pennsylvania where he studied landscape architecture and ecology, and an MFA in Sculpture from the University of North Carolina in 1992.

== Work ==
Kuby's works incorporate growing trees and other ecological processes such as entropy and decay, allowing these forces to participate in the sculptural form-making processes. His works are site-specific installations that juxtapose "the built and the unbuilt world" and explore how natural and human-made ecologies can come into closer dialog and inform one another. His works also engage with long arcs of time, as some of his works will continue to change and unfold over decades and centuries. Other artworks bring attention to the issues of climate disruption and sea level rise such as his Sea Level Clock #1 which he created during a Rauschenberg Foundation artists residency. As a member of Micro Galleries' Artists Collective, he made one of his projects, Sea Level 2080, available as an "open source project" for their 2019 Global Day of Creative Action. People could stake out pieces of blue fabric showing where the sea level was anticipated to be in the year 2080, the project had participants from four continents who created 90 works across 27 different countries and states.

Kuby's work grows out of his experiences working in landscape architecture, as an Urban Forester for Chapel Hill, North Carolina, and as an Exhibit Designer at the Bronx Zoo. Almost all his artworks are integrated into specific sites, urban landscapes, parklands or wilderness. His first Portland installation, called Walkwave, is a skateable sidewalk area entry into in Portland's Pier Park Skate Park that leads into the skate park.

Kuby has worked with many municipalities. In Seattle he created bird and bat habitats within sculptures in a Seattle city park offering urban habitat opportunities for other species to coexist with humans. He acted as design team artist for a nature playground in Portland's Westmoreland Park.

Kuby has made use of surplus human-made materials placed in natural settings, such as Breaker which makes use of sandstone from a demolished local high school in Aberdeen, Washington, rebuilt into an ocean wave shape. Kuby describes his work as "about flow and movement."

Kuby explores transformation and disfiguration, how objects can be reshaped, reconstituted, or re-seen through their interactions with visible and invisible forces, and with time. For a Clark College STEM Building commission, he took inspiration from the building's drop tower and created a hanging installation with objects that were malformed by being dropped from progressively taller heights. As part of the Djerassi Resident Artists Program he created Return, a series of redwood benches in a redwood grove appearing to slowly dismantle.

Works by Adam Kuby
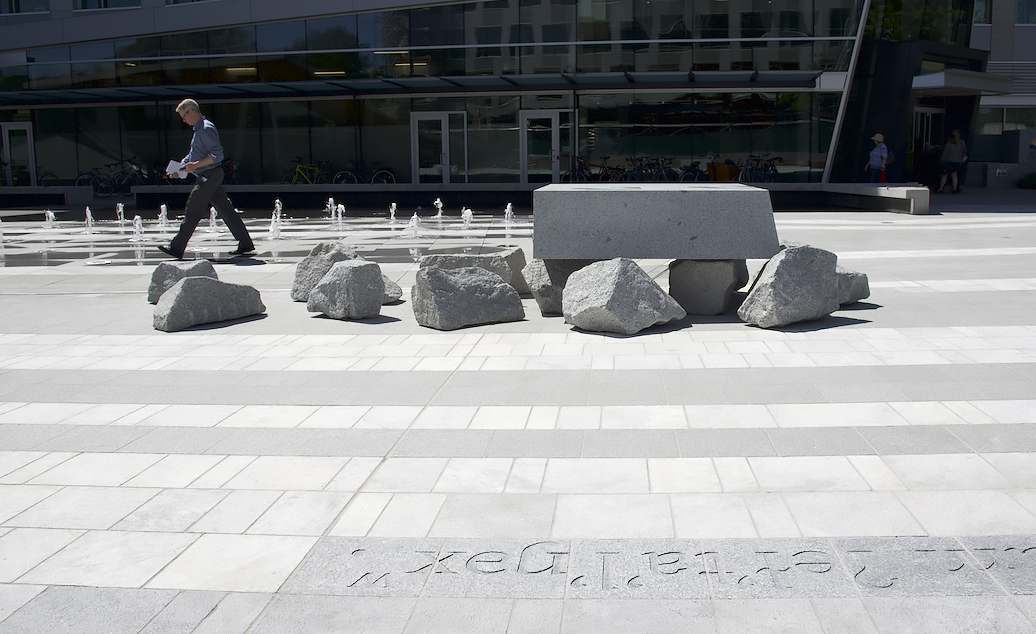
We Acknowledge, Victoria, BC (2019)

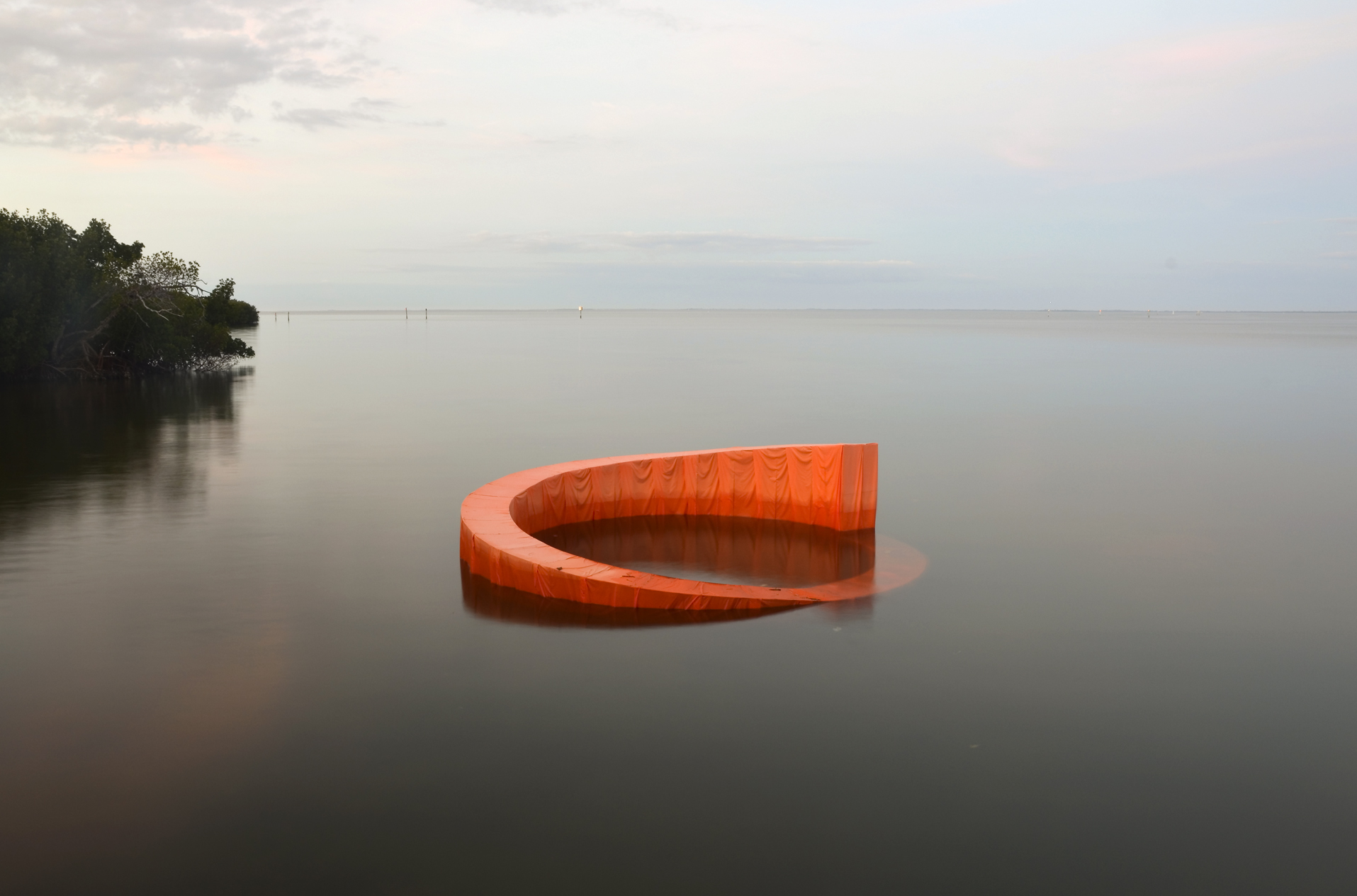
Sea Level Clock #1, Captiva, FL (2017)

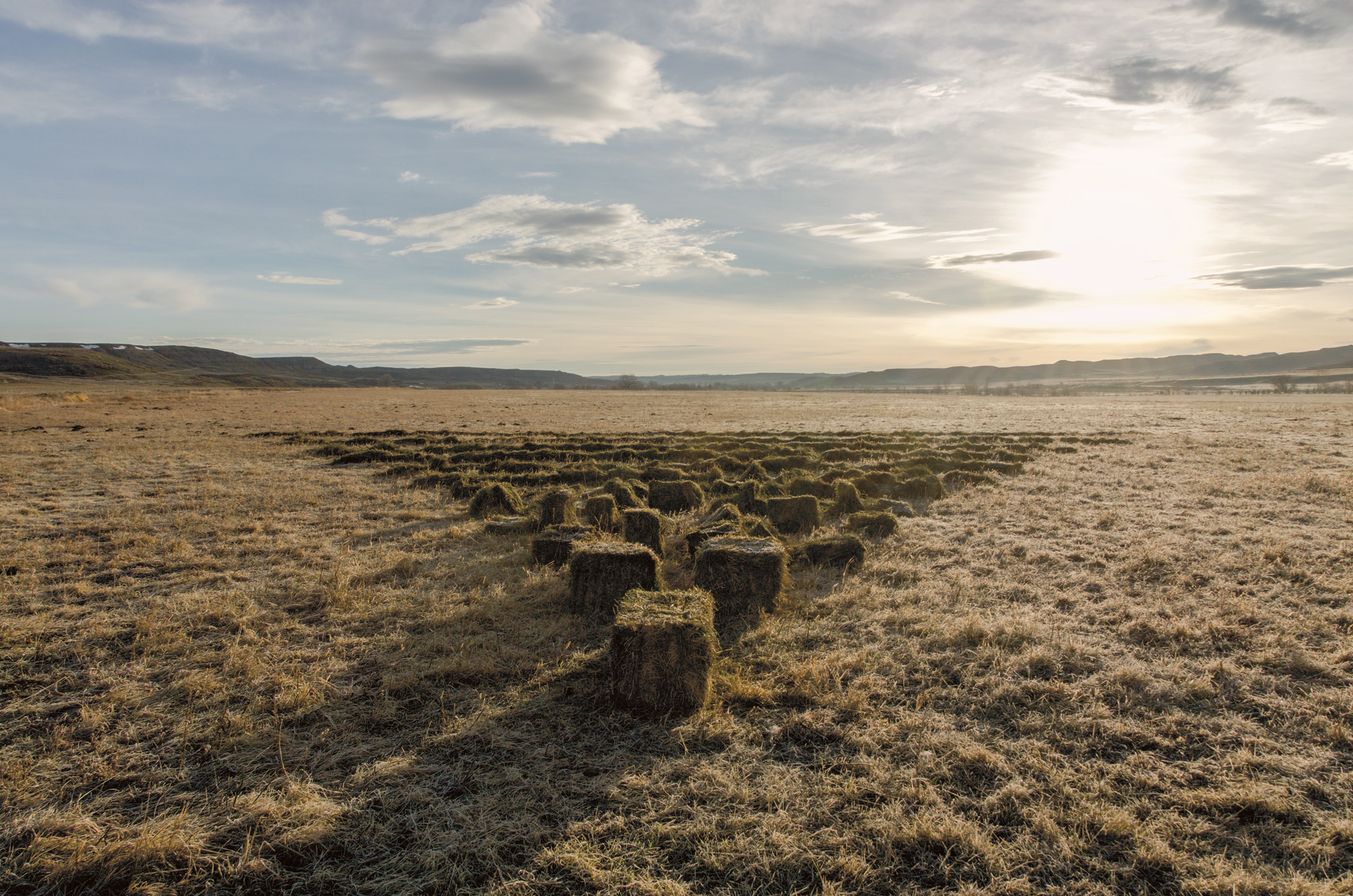
Bale, Ucross, WY (2017)

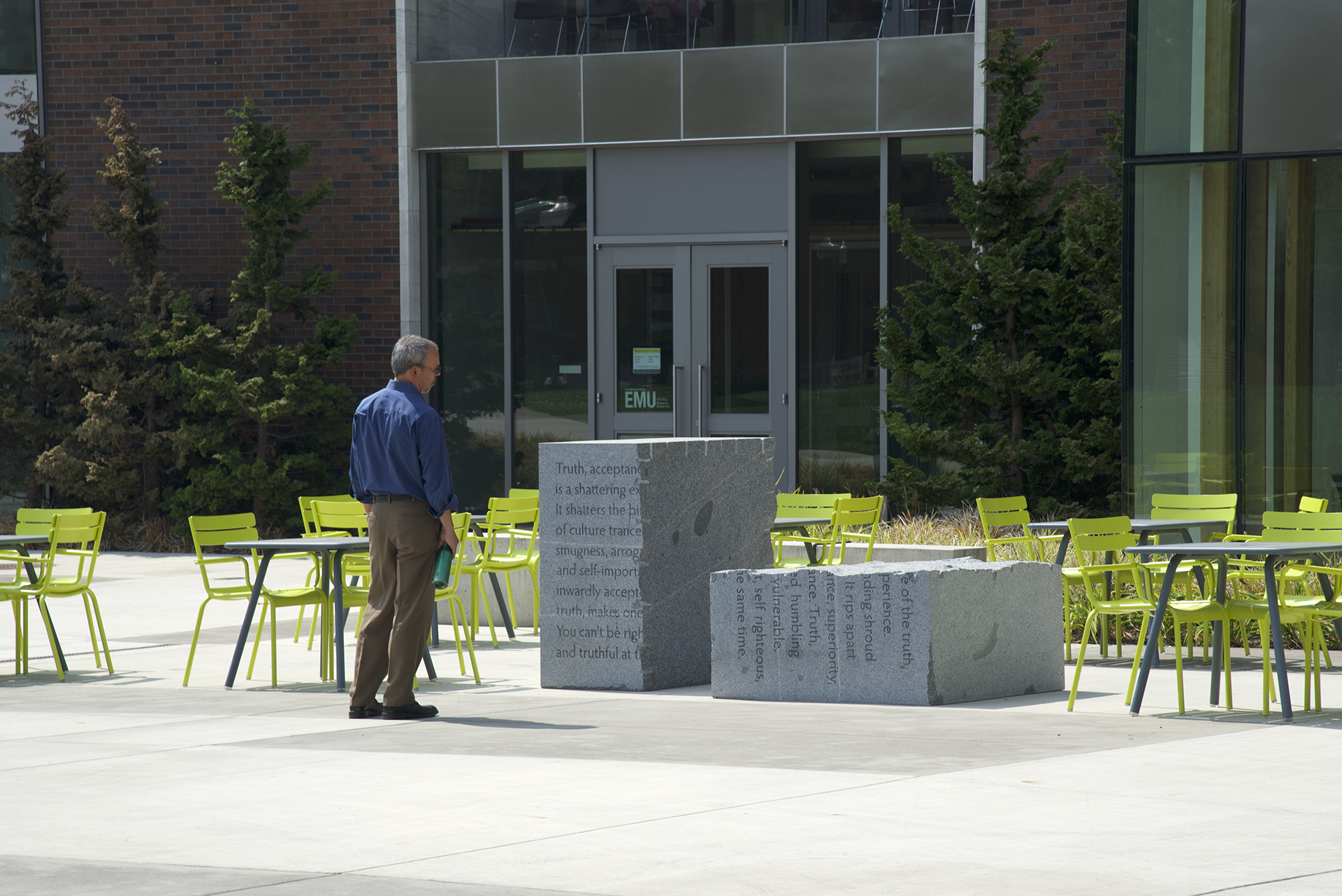
Aggregations, University of Oregon, Eugene OR (2017)

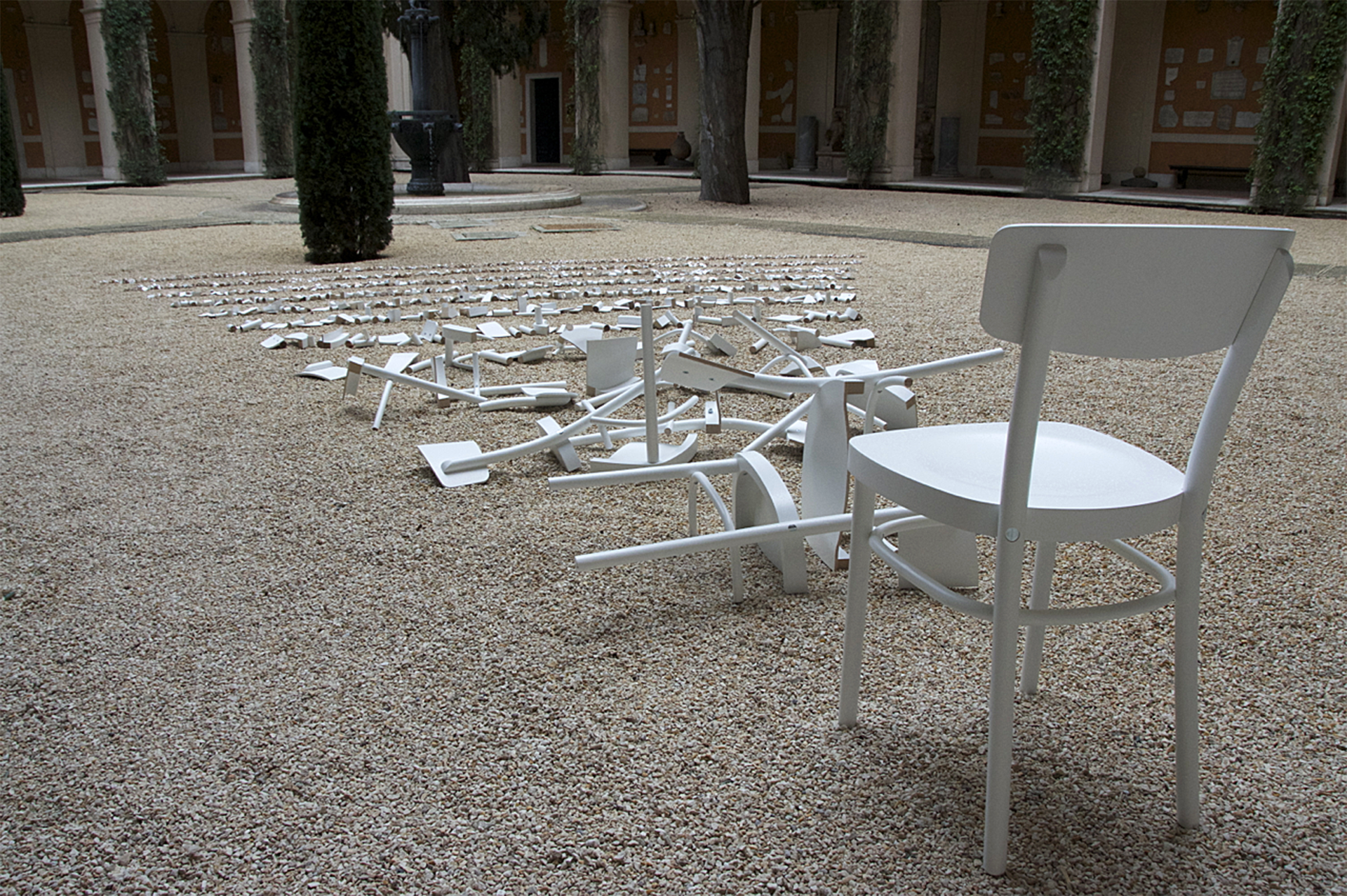
IKEA Chair, Rome, Italy (2015)

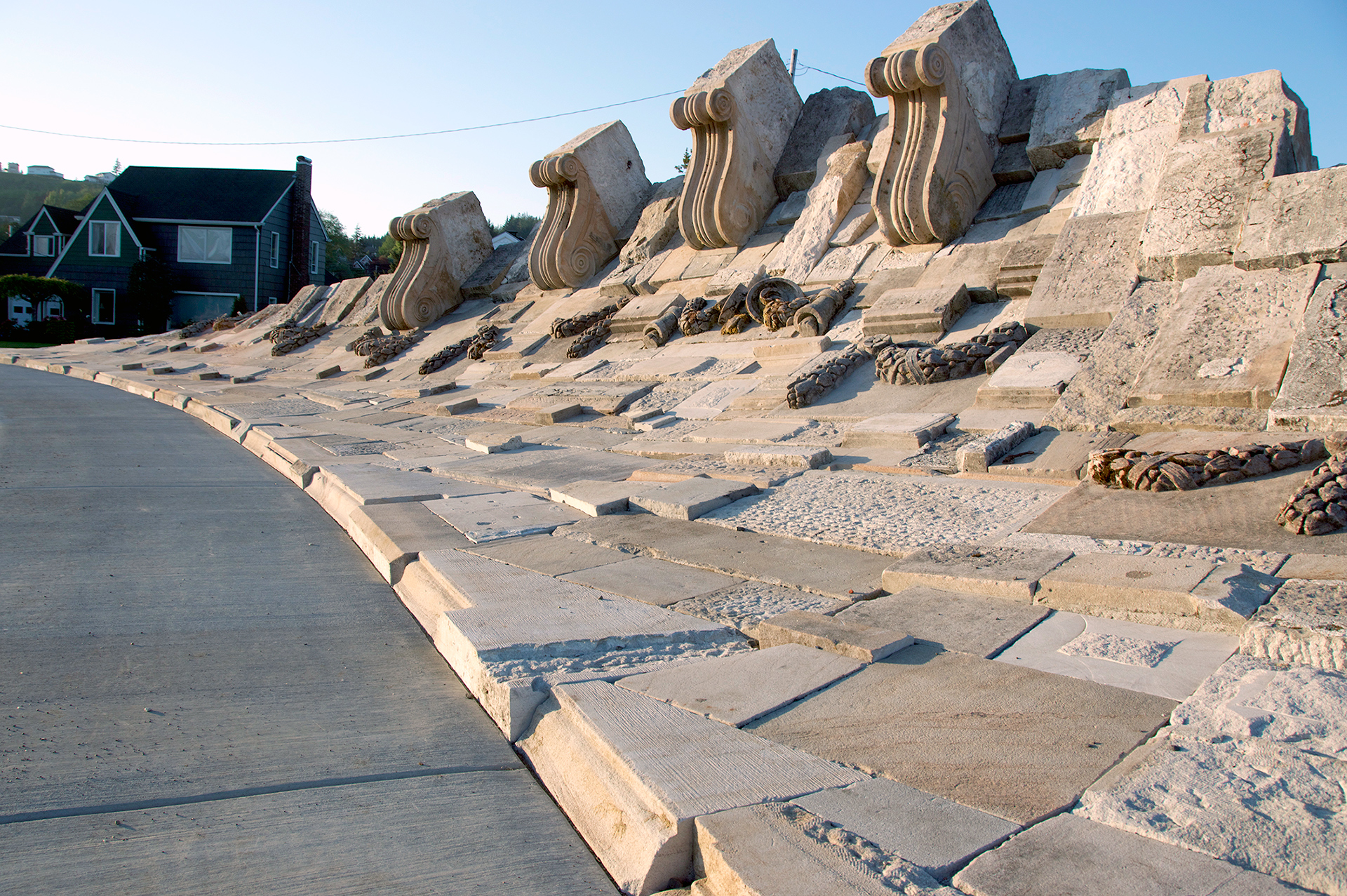
Breaker, Aberdeen, WA (2013)

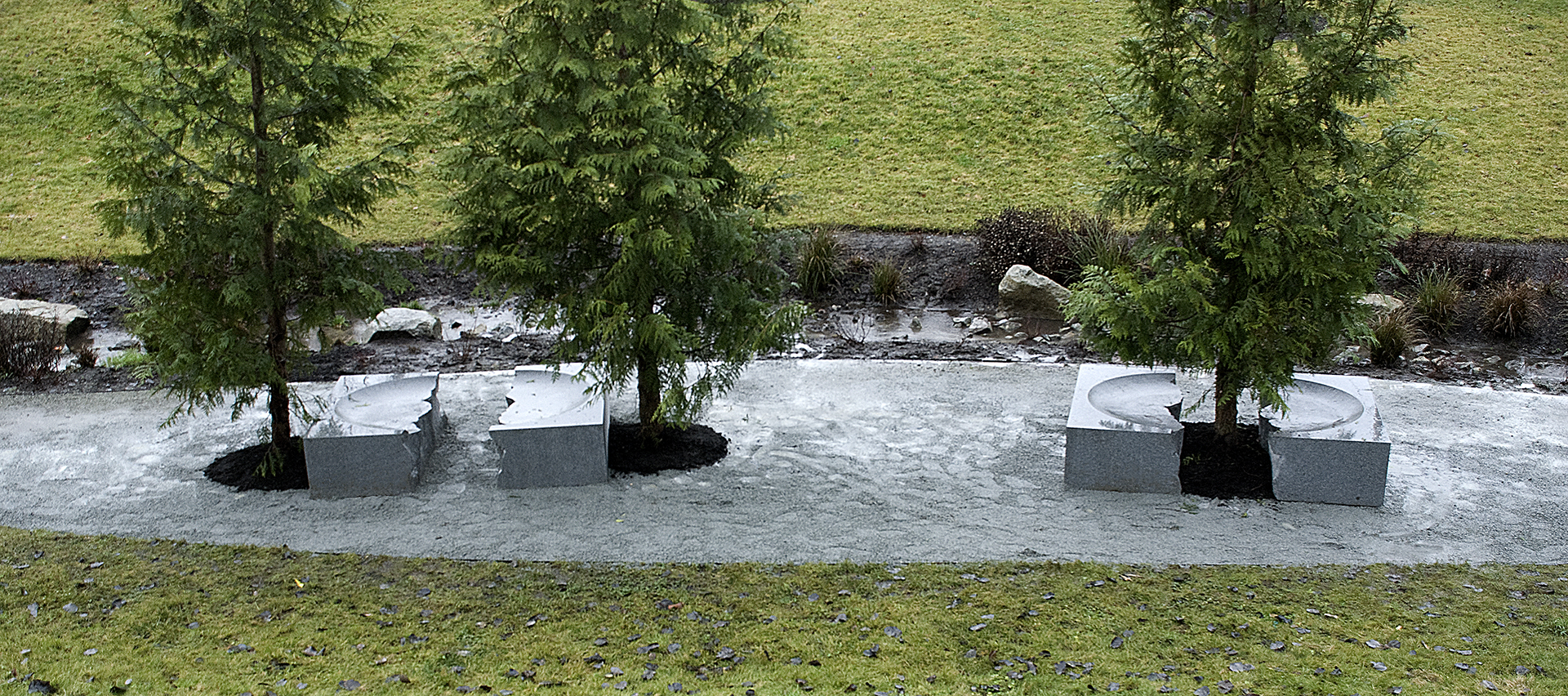
Incrementally, Seattle WA (2010)

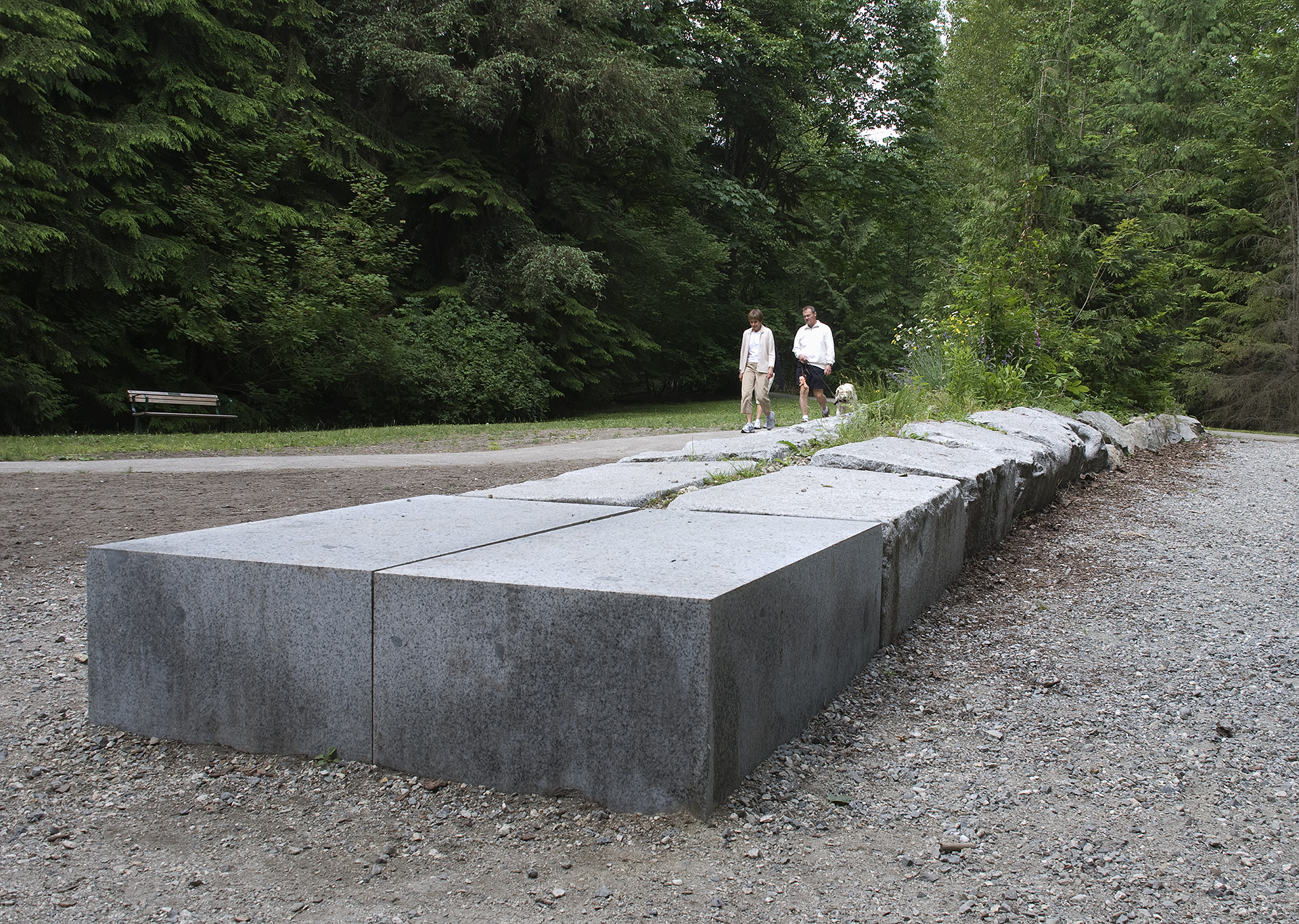
Eventually, Vancouver, BC (2009)

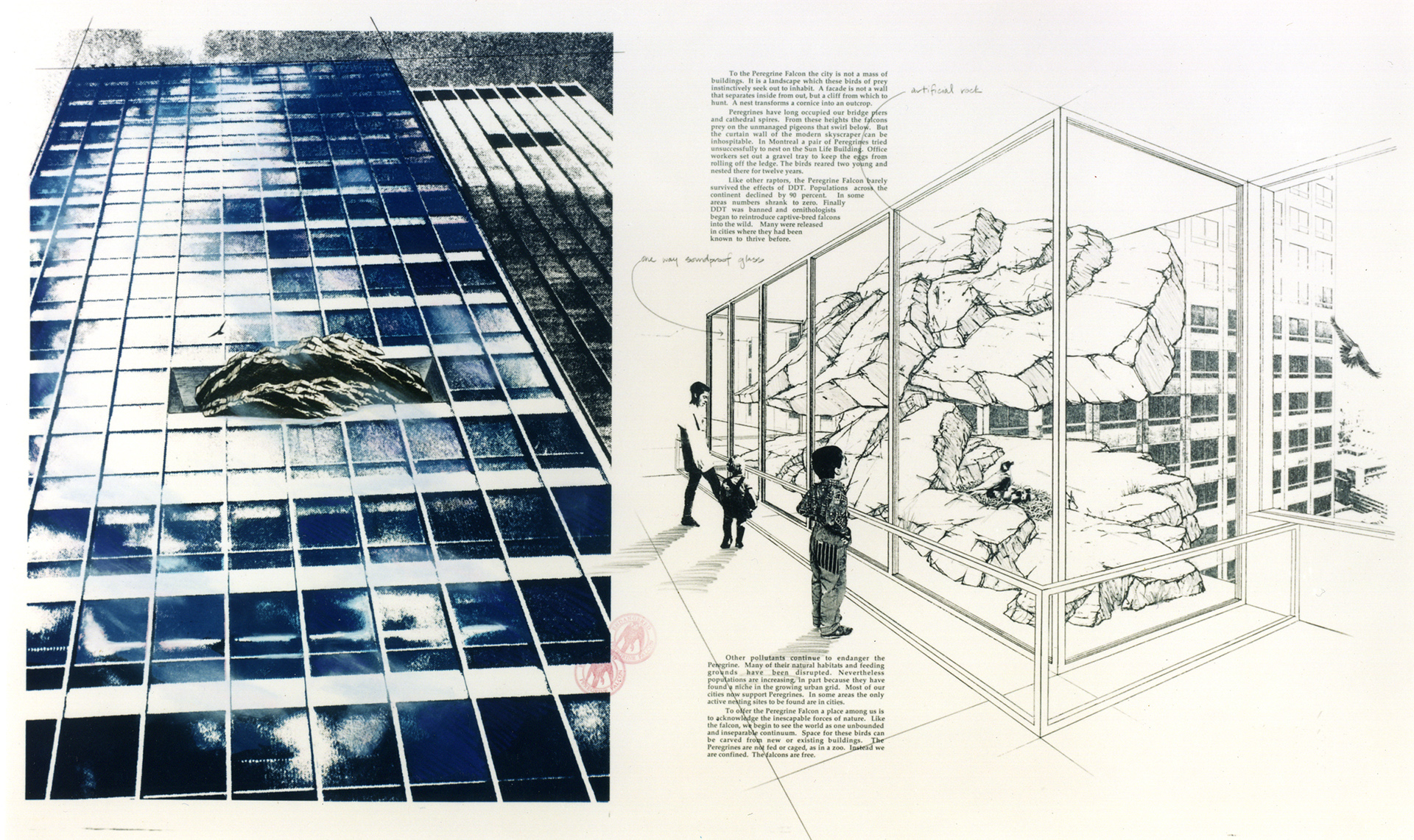
Cliff Dwelling - habitat for falcons in a skyscraper (1993)

== Honors and awards ==
Kuby's work on Westmoreland Park was selected by Americans for the Arts as one of the most outstanding public art pieces in the United States in 2014. Two of his other projects have received similar acclaim: Breaker in 2014, and Portland Acupuncture Project in 2017.

Kuby won the Oregon Art Commission Scholarship and the Rome Prize in Landscape Architecture which came with a residency at the American Academy in Rome for 2014–15. As part of his Rome Prize work, he participated in a cooperative performance and installation called Material Narratives, in which he and conservator Anna Serotta, and writers Liz Moore and Krys Lee, "explored the interpretation of fragmentary material culture."

For 2016 - 2017, Kuby was invited to participate in a residency at the Robert Rauschenberg Foundation's Rauschenberg Residency in Captiva, Florida, funded by The Ford Family Foundation's Visual Arts Program.
