= Gigantic Brewing Company =

Brewery in Portland, Oregon, U.S.

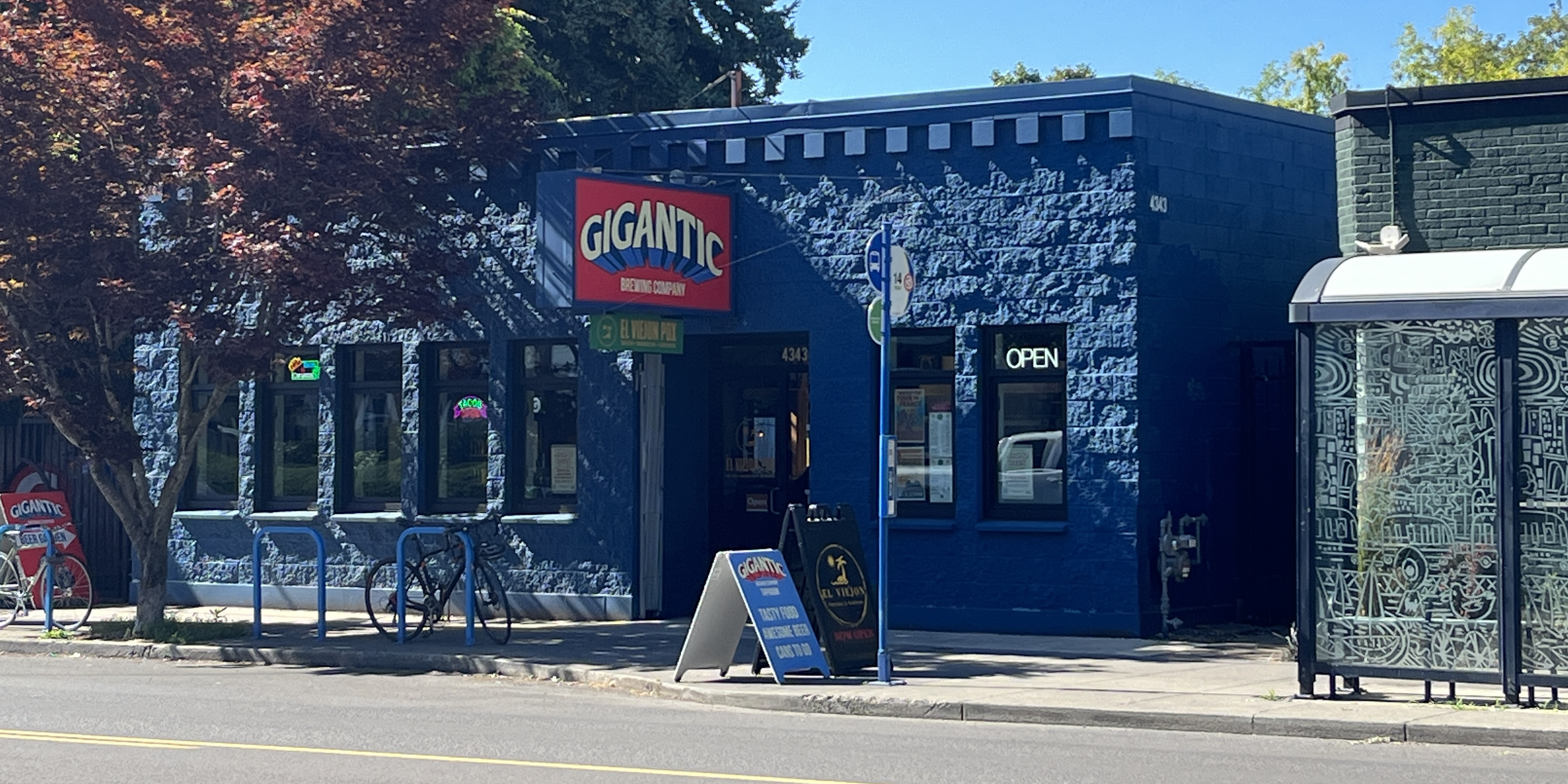
- Exterior of a location on Hawthorne Boulevard in southeast Portland, Oregon, 2025
- Headquarters: Portland, Oregon, United States
- Products: Beer
- Website: giganticbrewing.com

Gigantic Brewing Company is a brewery based in Portland, Oregon, United States. Ben Love and Van Havig launched the business in 2012.

The business operates three locations, as of 2022. The brewpub on 26th Avenue in the Reed neighborhood of southeast Portland has a patio, this in addition to several other taprooms.

The company makes a beer each year called Massive! Gigantic has also made a beer called Mill Ends Red, named after Mill Ends Park.

== See also ==
- Brewing in Oregon
