= Cycling in Portland, Oregon =

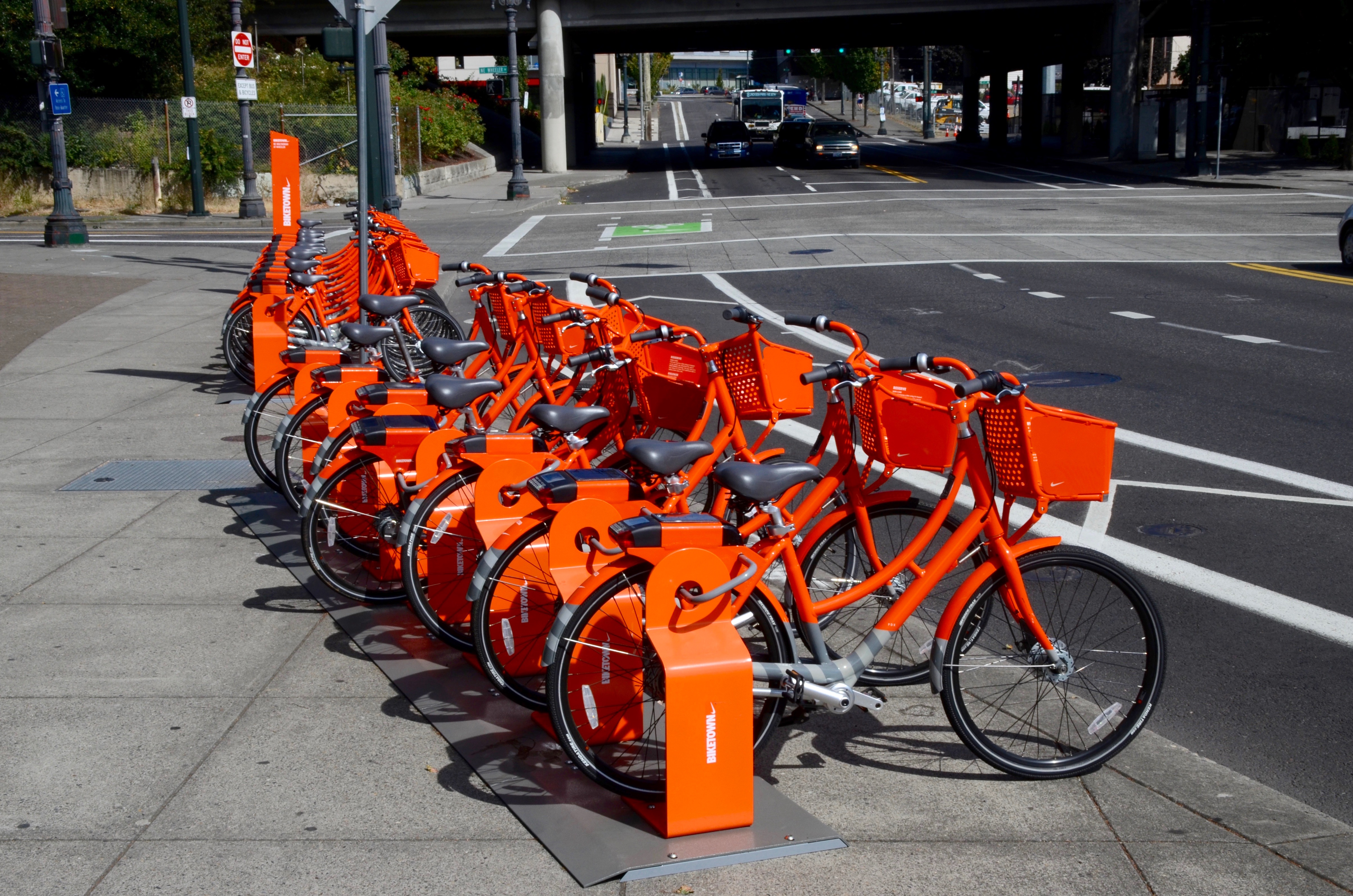
A station for Biketown, the city's new bicycle-sharing system

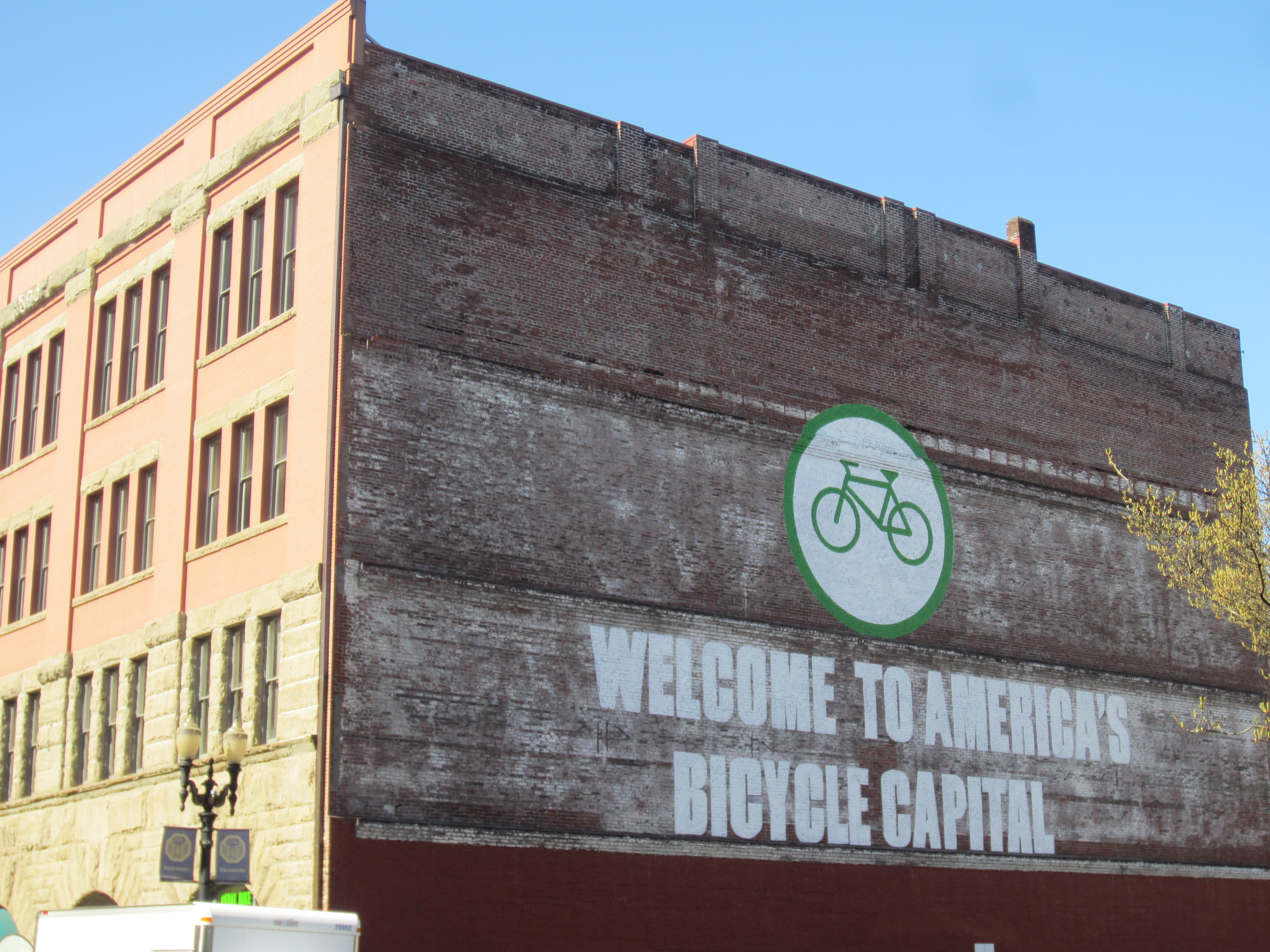
Bicycle mural in Portland, 2014

Bicycle use in Portland, Oregon has been growing rapidly, having nearly tripled since 2001; for example, bicycle traffic on four of the Willamette River bridges has increased from 2,855 before 1992 to over 16,000 in 2008, partly due to improved facilities. The Portland Bureau of Transportation says 6% of commuters bike to work in Portland, the highest proportion of any major U.S. city and about 10 times the national average.

Due to its urban bicycling efforts, Portland has earned multiple "bicycle-friendly city" awards, including being awarded platinum status by the League of American Bicyclists, and it ranked second in the CNBC's 2019 most bicycle-friendly cities in the US.

In July 2016, Portland launched a bike share program, named "Biketown" because of a naming rights deal with Nike, with 1,000 bikes and 100 stations. It is operated by Lyft. The new system logged more than 100,000 rides in its first two months of operation.

== History ==
Portland's reputation as a bike-friendly city was enhanced by The Yellow Bike Project, a 1994 civic engagement action led by local activists Tom O'Keefe, Joe Keating and Steve Gunther. O'Keefe proposed painting donated bikes – repaired by at-risk-youth served by the Community Cycling Center – bright yellow, and deploying them for free use around Portland. O'Keefe cited the Provo movement's White Bicycle Plan in Amsterdam as inspiration after watching the documentary "Sex Drugs & Democracy". "Gratis Pedalis Feralvus" was a tongue-in-cheek slogan for the quirky eco-transportation project. About a dozen yellow bikes, painted for free by a local auto body shop were launched. Eventually 60 to 100 bicycles were part of the project. Ultimately the project failed after bikes were stolen, vandalized, or thrown into the Willamette River.

=== Bicycle Transportation Alliance ===
The bicycle revolution in Portland started taking off with the founding of the Bicycle Transportation Alliance in November 1990. The first project of the BTA was persuading TriMet, the regional transit agency, to carry bicycles on its buses and light rail trains. BTA gathered over 7000 signatures and the support of numerous local city councils, prompting TriMet to conduct a one-year trial on a few bus lines. After a year of no significant problems and an increase in transit ridership by cyclists, TriMet instituted the first 100% bicycle accessible major transit system in the U.S. The Bicycle Transportation Alliance grew into one of the most effective cycling advocacy organizations in the U.S. The BTA focused on making major streets safe for cycling by advocating bicycle lanes, improvements to all seven pedestrian-accessible Willamette River bridges linking the downtown to the rest of the city and for safe, secure bicycle parking. In 1992, BTA successfully sued the City of Portland under ORS 366.514, the Oregon "Bicycle Bill," forcing the city to provide bicycle facilities as part of all projects. The City appealed this to the Oregon Court of Appeals which upheld the BTA's position, solidifying the responsibility of all governments in Oregon to provide safe bicycle and pedestrian facilities in all projects.

== Portland Bike Plan ==
Interest in city transportation planning began in the early 1970s after the state of Oregon passed comprehensive state land use laws with the city of Portland drafting its first 'Bicycle Master Plan' in 1973.

The city's first bike plan that was adopted in 1973, titled the '1973 Portland Bike Plan', called for nearly 190 miles of bicycle infrastructure to be built in the city and created a citizen's Bicycle Advisory Committee along with a Bicycle Program within the city's Transportation Bureau.

By 1996, after the city had created the nearly 190 miles of initial bicycle infrastructure from the first plan, the city adopted its second bike plan in 1996, titled the 'Portland Bicycle Master Plan', which called for an additional 445 miles of bicycle infrastructure to be built over the next 20 years (cumulative of 630 miles by 2016).

The city revised its bicycle plan again in February 2010 when the Portland City Council unanimously adopted its third bike plan, titled the 'Portland Bicycle Plan for 2030', which called for $613 million of spending on bicycle infrastructure over the next 20 years to expand the bicycle infrastructure target from 630 miles by 2016 to 962 miles by 2030 and increase the daily bicycle modal share from the current 7-8% to 25% by 2030. With only about 300 miles of bicycle infrastructure built by the end of 2009, the plan sets a target of building 662 miles of new bicycle infrastructure in the city over the next 20 years.

With enabling legislation from the 2011 session, Portland lowered speed limits from 25 to 20 miles per hour (40 to 32 km/h) on 70 miles (110 km) of designated neighborhood greenway streets to increase safety for increasingly heavy use by pedestrians and bicyclists.

== Bicycle infrastructure ==
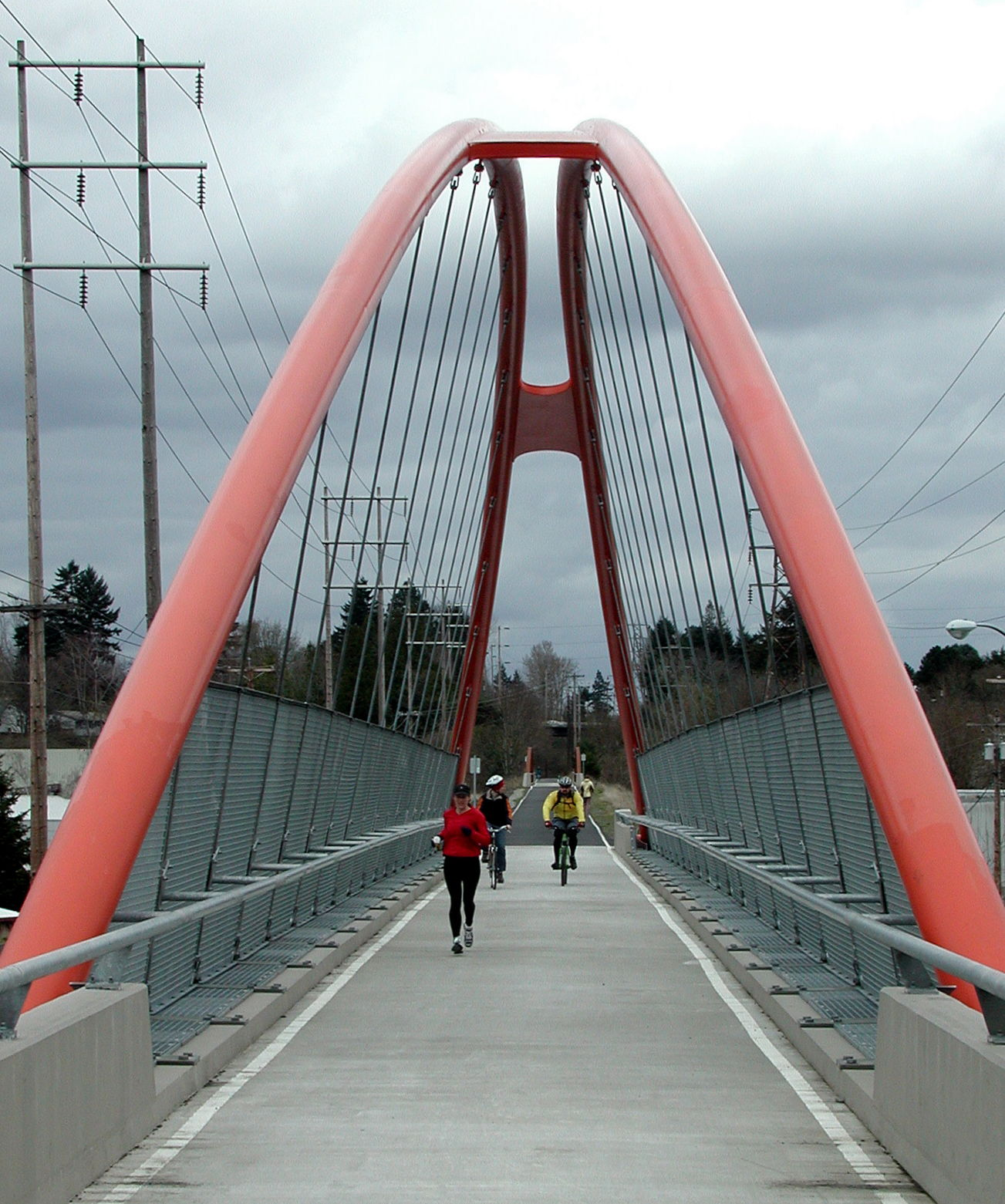
the McLoughlin Boulevard Pedestrian Bridge arches over Southeast McLoughlin Boulevard, a part of the Springwater Corridor Trail along Johnson Creek

Portland is developing a network of bicycle boulevards to make cycling easier and safer. The east side of Portland is particularly well-suited for this technique due to its consistent grid of north–south and east–west streets. The boulevards are defined with a combination of street markings, signs, and better signals for crossing busy intersections.

Another route is the Vera Katz Eastbank Esplanade.

In order to try to prevent car-bike crashes the city has painted sections of hazardous bike lanes blue.

More recently, the city has installed experimental bike boxes that allow bicyclists to wait ahead of motorized traffic at red lights.

An important milestone in Portland's utility cycling infrastructure was the expansion of the sidewalks of Hawthorne Bridge in 1997, which significantly improved the safety and ease of bicycle commuting across the Willamette River.

In 2004, a bike path along the Sunset Highway between Sylvan and Cedar Hills was completed, helping to link Beaverton and downtown Portland.

Bicycle access to the Morrison Bridge opened to mixed reviews in March 2010.

Since the 2010s, the City of Portland has increased construction of personal motor-vehicle free bridges for pedestrians and cyclists whose commute crosses busy interstates or the Willamette river, and need a safe route. Some of these bridges include the Blumenauer Bridge (2022), Ned Flanders Crossing (2021), and the Tilikum Crossing (2015), which is open to pedestrians and cyclists, as well as MAX, buses, and Streetcar.

In 2021, PBOT began to place large concrete planters to replace the traffic cones they had used for the previous year, in order to slow down traffic on neighborhood streets. They were strategically placed at intersections in residential neighborhoods to act as modal filters, and most have signage above them which indicate a recommended speed limit of 15 mph.

=== Parking ===
A recent project will bring covered bicycle parking to the popular southeast Hawthorne Boulevard shopping district.

== Events ==
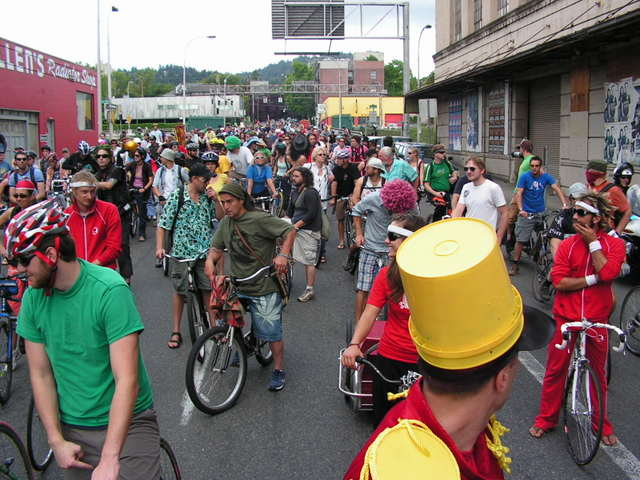
2007 Tour de Fat group ride

The Bicycle Transportation Alliance sponsors an annual Bike Commute Challenge, in which thousands of commuters compete for prizes and recognition based on the length and frequency of their commutes.

The Portland World Naked Bike Ride is the world's largest iteration of the World Naked Bike Ride protest. The Portland tradition was established in 2004. The Portland Sunday Parkways series was established in 2008.

The annual event Ladds 500 was established in 2016 for the purpose of riding around a park in Ladd's Addition 500 times, individually or as part of a team. The Portland Criterium has been held annually since 2022.

Bike Summer (also known as Pedalpalooza) is an annual festival with hundreds of community-organized free bike events.

== Statistics ==
The following table shows Portland's historical bike commuting mode share with data coming from the Census Bureau's annual American Community Survey:

Calendar year	1990	2000	2005	2010	2014
Portland bike c. share	1.2%	1.8%	3.5%	6.0%	7.2%
National bike c. share	0.4%	0.4%	0.4%	0.5%	0.6%

== See also ==
- List of U.S. cities with most bicycle commuters
- Cycling in Seattle
- Clothing-optional bike ride
