= People's Bike Library of Portland =

Sculpture in Portland, Oregon, U.S.

- The sculpture in 2015
- Artist: Brian Borrello; Rankin Renwick
- Year: 2009
- Type: Sculpture
- Medium: Steel; gold leaf
- Dimensions: 5.2 m × 2.1 m × 2.1 m (17 ft × 7 ft × 7 ft)
- Location: Portland, Oregon, United States; 45.52275°N 122.68403°W
- Owner: City of Portland and Multnomah County Public Art Collection courtesy of the Regional Arts & Culture Council

People's Bike Library of Portland, also known as Zoobomb Pyle or simply "the pile", is a 2009 steel and gold leaf sculpture by local artists Brian Borrello and Rankin Renwick, located in Portland, Oregon, in the United States. It was erected in collaboration with the Zoobomb bicycling collective, and serves as a bicycle parking rack, a "lending library" for weekly bike riders, and a monument to the city's bike culture. The sculpture features a two-story spiral pillar with a gold-plated small bicycle on top; bicycles intended for Zoobomb riders are locked to the pillar and base, which has metal loops serving as hooks.

The sculpture is part of the City of Portland and Multnomah County Public Art Collection, courtesy of the Regional Arts & Culture Council, which commissioned the work with funds from the Portland Department of Transportation. The collaboration between the two groups was occasioned by the "Art on the Streets" program set up by Mayor Sam Adams.

== Background ==
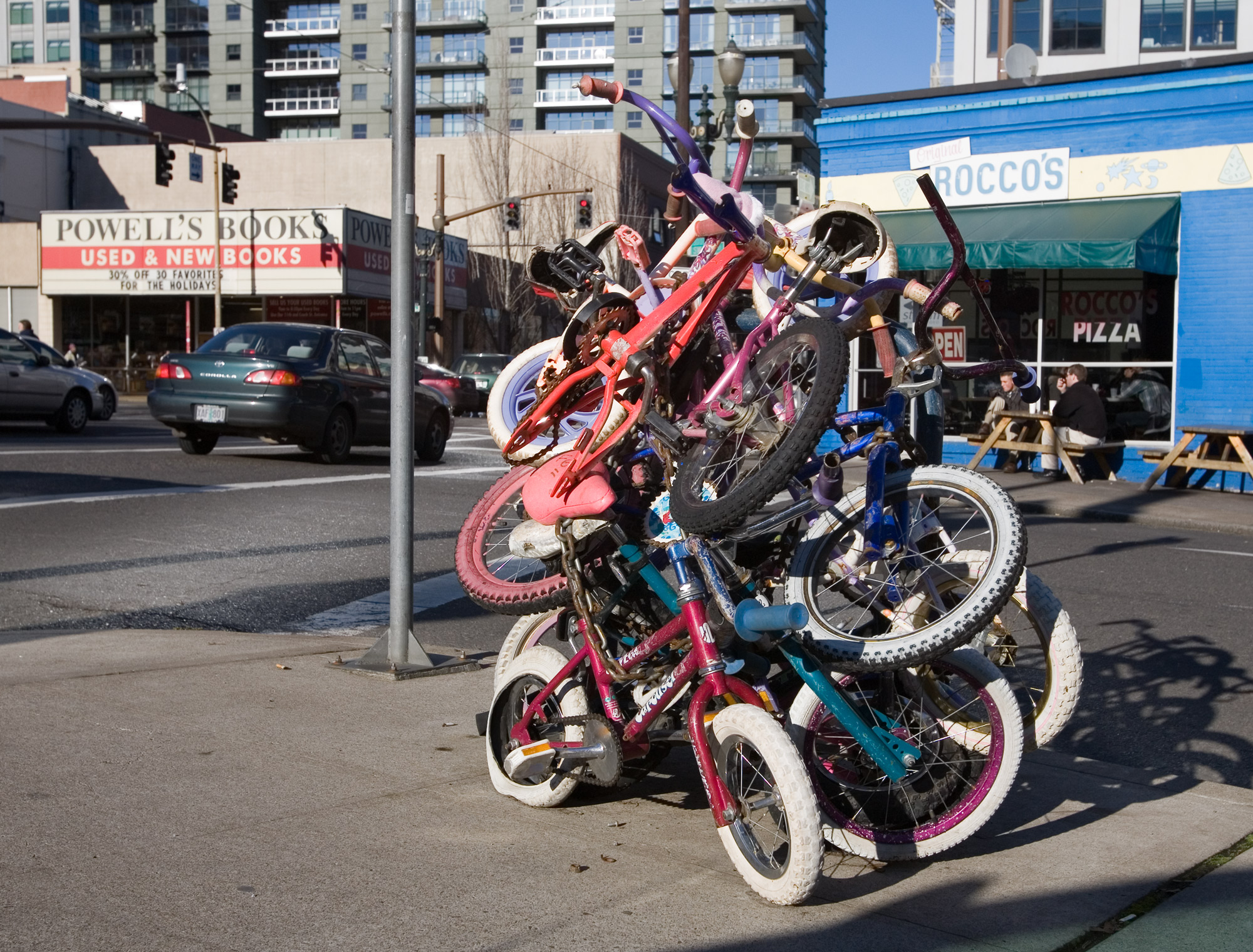
"Zoobomb pile" in 2007, prior to the erection of the 2009 sculpture

In the early 2000s, "fun-seeking mini-bike lovers" began gathering for weekly bicycle rides down a hill, starting near the Oregon Zoo. The event acquired the name Zoobomb from the barely-controlled rapid downhill ride, known to cyclists as "bombing", in close proximity to the zoo. The association of the group with the word "bombing" once led to an investigation by the Portland Bureau of Police, who feared that the group was composed of domestic terrorists. Prior to the sculpture's installation, bikes were stored at the "Holy Rack", or "Zoobomb pile", located at Southwest 10th Avenue and Oak Street.

People's Bike Library of Portland existed by 2006 as an informal bicycle-sharing system – what the operators called a bicycle "library" – open to those who purchased a $5 identification card from a custodian called "Handsome Dave". BikePortland.org worked with the city to secure $10,000 from the Portland Department of Transportation, in order to create a city-recognized bicycle parking rack and artwork out of the library "pyle".

== Description ==
People's Bike Library of Portland is a steel and gold leaf sculpture designed by local artists Brian Borrello and Rankin Renwick. It was installed in a traffic island at the intersection of West Burnside Street and Southwest 13th Avenue in downtown Portland in 2009. Erected in collaboration with Zoobomb, the sculpture is multi-purpose, serving as a functional rack, a bike "lending library", and a monument to Portland's bike culture. It is 17 feet (5.2 m) tall on a 7 by 7 feet (2.1 by 2.1 m) base and features a two-story spiral-shaped pillar, topped with a gold-plated small bicycle, which Renwick has referred to as the "cherry on top!" A collection of children's bikes, intended for use by riders at weekly Zoobomb meetings, are locked to the sculpture. The base includes metal loops which act as hooks for the bicycles.

The work is part of the City of Portland and Multnomah County Public Art Collection courtesy of the Regional Arts & Culture Council, which commissioned the project for $10,000 with funds from the Portland Department of Transportation. Mayor Sam Adams helped bring the sculpture to fruition through his new program known as "Art on the Streets", a collaborative effort by the Bureau of Transportation and the Regional Arts & Culture Council.

== Unveiling ==
On May 29, 2009, Adams and other community leaders hosted an event to commemorate the sculpture. The participants, who included a variety of cycling enthusiasts and current and former Zoobombers, gathered at the former "Holy Rack" before parading to the sculpture. The parade had been promoted by the Bicycle Transportation Alliance and City Repair Project, and featured small and tall bikes, chopper bicycles, and a homemade bakfiets. At the ceremony, long-time Zoobomber Shannon Palermo introduced the Regional Arts & Culture Council's public art manager, who spoke about the work. "Handsome Dave" thanked those who made both Zoobomb and the sculpture possible, then introduced Adams, who cut the ribbon after a countdown and spoke about the work's origins. He said:

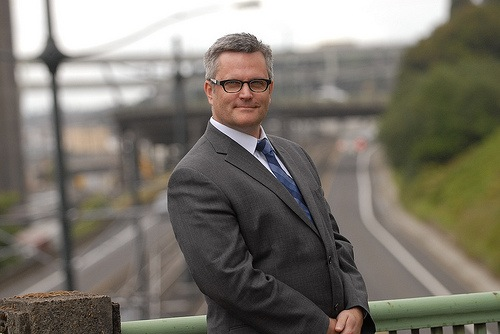
Mayor Sam Adams spoke at the dedication ceremony for People's Bike Library. His "Art on the Streets" program helped bring the sculpture to fruition.

It was three or four years ago that Mr. Handsome said, 'you know what, we need a place to catalog and store our bikes' ... He said we want to do a sculpture ... and he said, 'Oh and we want you to pay for it!' ... Portland's bike culture is not only fun, it's absolutely necessary for the future success of this city, to reduce our footprint on the environment, to make ourselves a lot more healthy ... and it's great, quirky stuff like this that makes Portland, Portland, and I was really proud be a little part of it.

Following Adams' speech, attendees created the first pile of small bicycles. One participant, who was one of the first women of Zoobomb, said about the creation of the first new pile: "I pushed through the crowd and handed it forth, bowing in honor of the golden b(eye)cycle winking in the sun. As I retreated to the crowd, my whole body was shaking. My hands were in disbelief. I paced in a circle and half-sigh/half-laughed and this darn smile was holding me so tight, I felt like the kiln was burning it into my clay, smile-shaped cheeks forever." A long chain was wrapped through each of the nearly twenty bicycles, which were locked to the sculpture by Adams. Event attendees then posed for a group picture, and sang a song called "16" Rims", a parody of Janis Joplin's "Mercedez Benz". The commemoration ended with "dancing in the streets" and music by The Sprockettes.

== Reception ==
Jonathan Maus of BikePortland.org described the sculpture as a "functional work of public art that will serve not just as a place to store Zoobomb bikes and equipment, but as a visual testimony to what makes Portland, Portland", and called the day of its installation one that "will live forever in Portland's bike-cultural history". Furthermore, he said the work recognizes Zoobomb as a tradition, a "civic and cultural institution with deep connections" to the city. In his coverage of the dedication ceremony, Maus wrote: "It's important to remember that this is not just for Zoobomb. It's for all of us. It's from a City that encourages and recognizes the power of creative expression and activism embodied not just in a physical monument, but in the spirit of every Portlander." In Frommer's: Portland Day by Day, author Julian Smith called the sculpture a "pile on a pole" and included it in a list of "offbeat" city attractions. Other general Portland guidebooks like Falcon Guides and Moon Guides hail the sculpture as a city attraction, as do bicycling-specific guides.

== See also ==
- 2009 in art
