= Biketown =

Bike sharing system in Portland, Oregon, United States

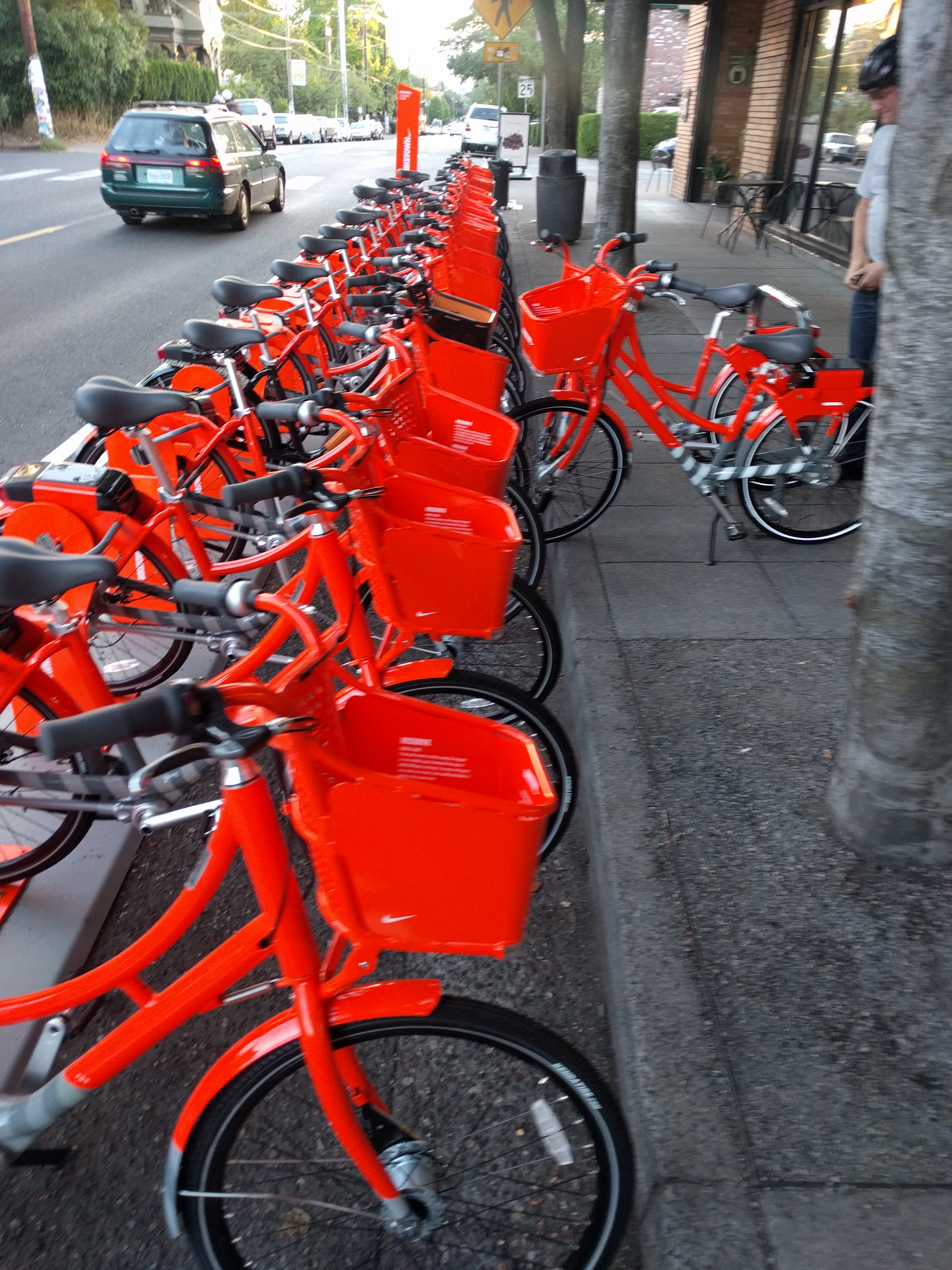
- Crowded Biketown station on Belmont Street late on launch day

Overview
- Owner: Portland Bureau of Transportation
- Locale: Portland, Oregon
- Transit type: Bicycle-sharing system
- Number of stations: 133
- Website: biketownpdx.com

Operation
- Began operation: July 19, 2016; 10 years ago
- Operator: Lyft
- Number of vehicles: 1,000

Biketown (stylized as BIKETOWN), also known as Biketown PDX, is a bicycle-sharing system in Portland, Oregon, that began operation on July 19, 2016. The system is owned by Portland Bureau of Transportation (PBOT) and operated by Lyft, with Nike, Inc. as the title sponsor. At launch, the system had 100 stations and 1,000 bicycles serving the city's central and eastside neighborhoods, with hopes to expand outward.

== History ==
Planning for a modern bicycle-sharing system for Portland began in 2009, under the direction of PBOT. Beginning in 1994, a group of Portlanders experimented with a free community bike sharing system called the "Yellow Bike Project"; the program, inspired by a similar scheme in Amsterdam and operated by the Community Cycling Center, was declared a failure three years later after many of the bikes were subject to vandalism, theft and disrepair.

In December 2011, Metro approved the allocation of a $2 million federal grant to PBOT for the development of a bike share system. Alta Bike Share, a national operator of similar systems headquartered in Portland, was contracted in September 2012 to be the system's operator. The $4 million cost of the system and inability to secure a corporate sponsor led to several delays in the planned launch.

In March 2014, selected supplier Bixi declared bankruptcy, forcing another delay in the system's launch to 2015. Planned operator Alta Bike Share would later be sold to Motivate in October.

In September 2015, the Portland City Council approved a new contract with Motivate to move forward on the bikeshare program. Motivate went on to place a $1.5 million order placed with Social Bicycles to manufacture and deliver "smart" bicycles that include on-board computers and other technologies.

In January 2016, Portland-area based Nike signed a $10 million, five-year deal to be the program's sponsor, naming it "Biketown". On June 13, 2016, officials announced various details for the program, including a launch date of July 19. More than 1,000 Portlanders signed up for the first batch of annual memberships by launch day, and almost 2,500 during the first month of the service.

The service launched on July 19, 2016, during a ceremony in which 150 riders took an inaugural ride across the Tilikum Crossing bridge. During the service's first month, almost 59,000 rides were taken. Holders of annual memberships accounted for 36 percent of rides taken during that period.

The placement of Biketown stations that replaced public street parking sparked some controversy over a "lack of outreach" by PBOT.

In April 2023, Portland and Biketown announced that they were to add about 500 new e-bikes to their fleet. This would bring the total count to about 2,000 bikes. The new Biketown stations that are being built will be made from recycled footwear scraps and rubber.

== Service area ==
Portland residents were surveyed online and invited to five open house discussions to decide the locations of the bike racks. The final locations were based on the 4,500 responses. As of its launch in 2016, Biketown operates 100 stations in 8 square miles (21 km^{2}) of the city.

Neighborhoods that are served by Biketown include:

- Downtown Portland
- Pearl District
- Goose Hollow
- Nob Hill
- Rose Quarter
- Lloyd District
- Piedmont
- Humboldt
- Kerns
- Buckman
- Hosford-Abernethy

== Pricing and fees ==
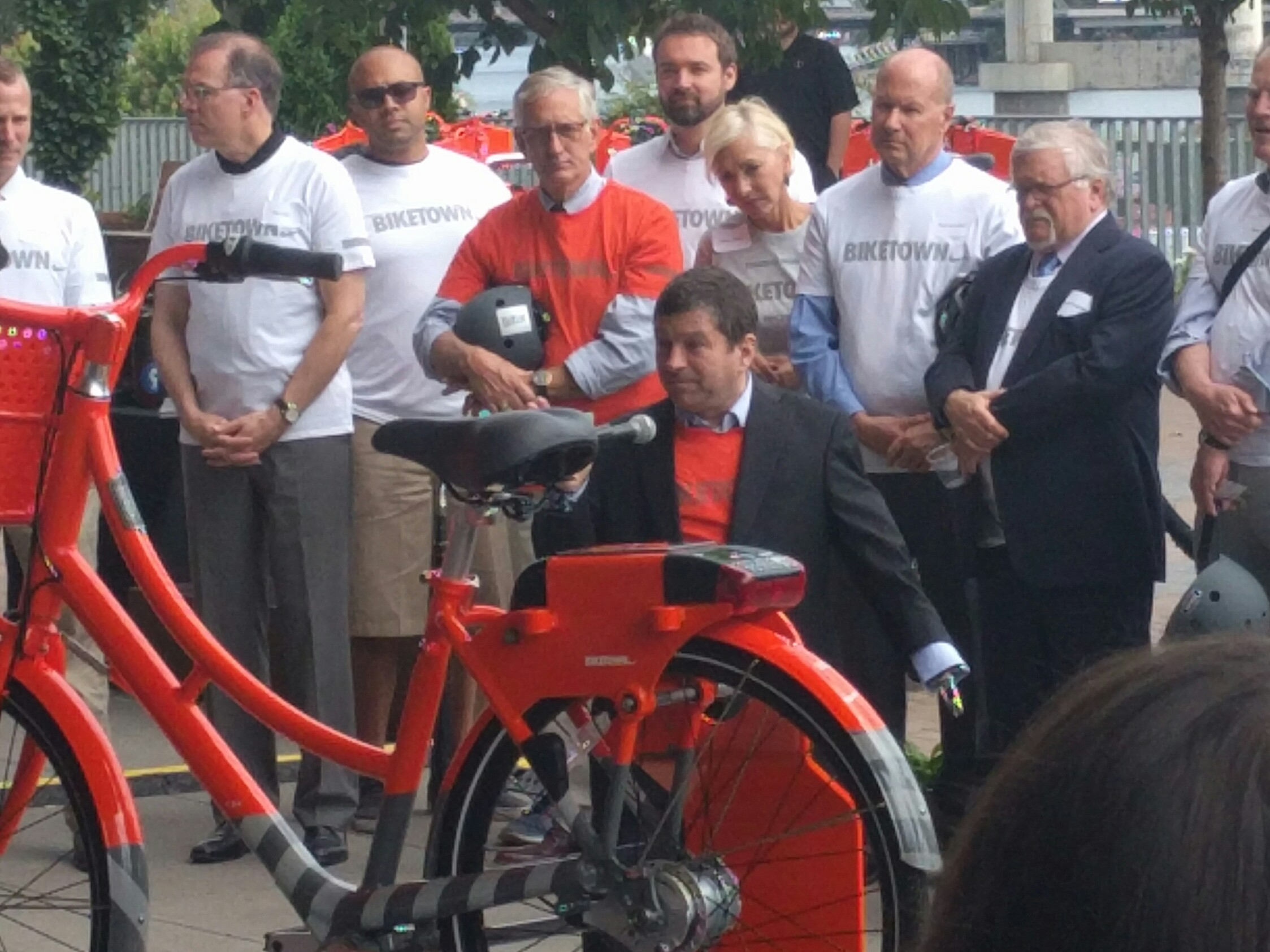
Commissioner Steve Novick speaking at Biketown launch event. Other dignitaries, including Mayor Charlie Hales, in background.

Biketown operates with two payment options for riders. A single-ride fare costs $1.00 to unlock a bike and a $0.35 per minute rate is activated until the ride is terminated. An annual membership of $99 per year includes free unlocks and a rate of $0.15 per minute.

A fee of $1 is charged for locking a bicycle at a public rack within the system area; a fee of $25 is charged for the doing the same outside of the system area.

There is a discount program available for low income participants called Biketown for All. This program offers free unlocks, $10 in monthly ride credits, $0.05 per minutes rides, and is a free annual membership. In order to qualify for this program, members must be 16 or older, and can provide proof that their household receives SNAP, FAFSA, OHP, unemployment assistance, affordable housing assistance, utility assistance, or other social services.

== Equipment ==
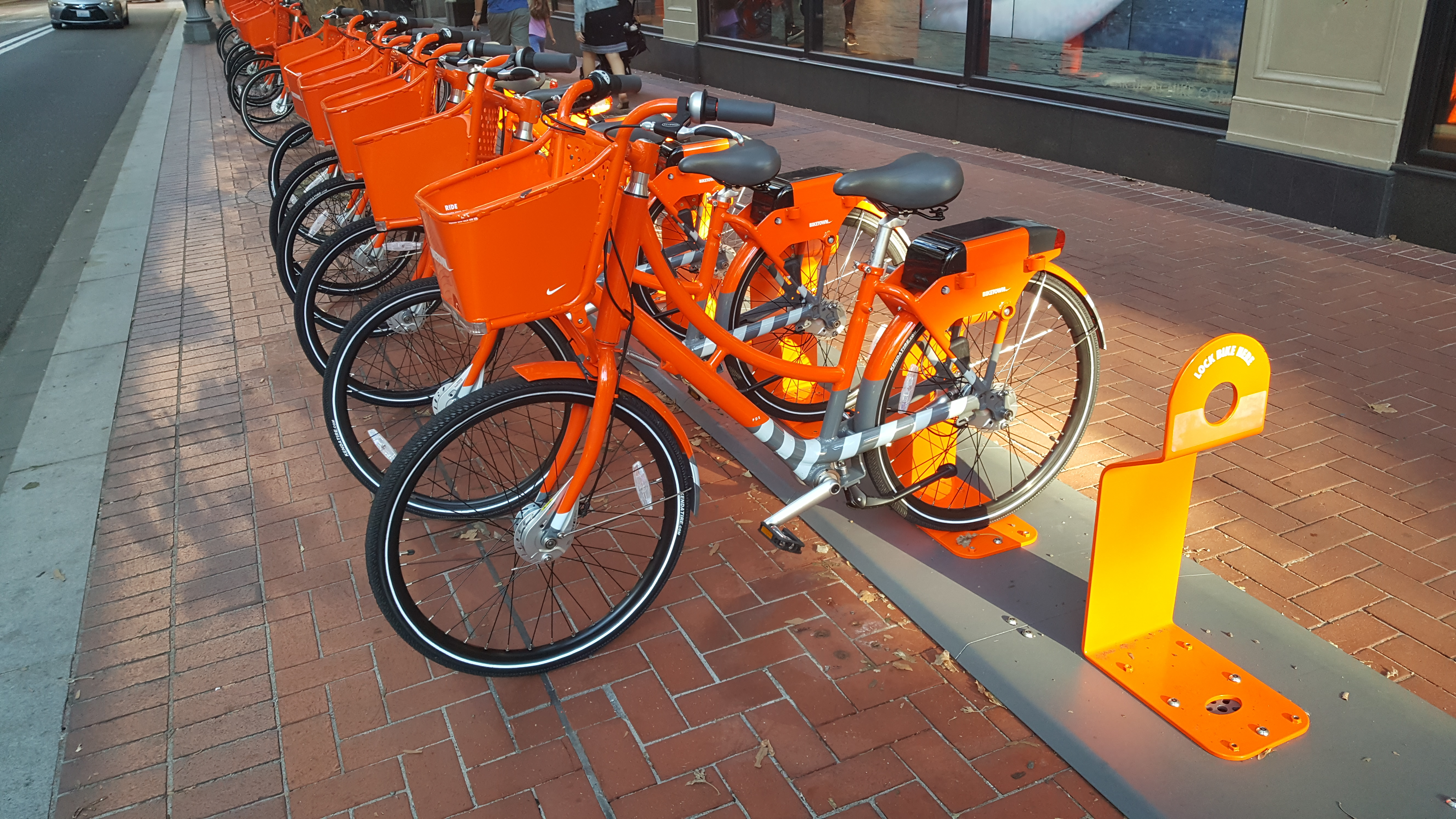
Row of bicycles next to the Nike Store in downtown Portland, 2016

Biketown's fleet of 1,000 bicycles were manufactured by Social Bicycles of Brooklyn, New York and designed in part by Nike, at a cost of $1,500 each. The eight-speed bikes weigh 45 pounds (20 kg) and come equipped with automatic lights and a bell; the seat is positioned for upright ridership. Unlike a typical bike share system, Biketown's bicycles do not need to be docked at a designated station, instead using on-board computers with location tracking and U locks; this allows bikes to be stored at public bicycle racks, though users are charged an additional fee. Bikes are rented by customers using a PIN, generated by a smartphone app or computer, or a member card. Biketown is the largest self-secured bike share system in North America.

In June 2016, PBOT announced plans to add "adaptive bikes", such as handcycles and tricycles, that can be rented for people with disabilities. They will be branded as Biketown but will be organized through local adaptive bike shops, rather than at the standard street kiosks.

Biketown does not provide helmets for its users, but does offer coupons to purchase one at a store.

The original fleet of Biketown bicycles were retired in September 2020 after their replacement e-bicycles entered service. The remaining 750 bicycles were donated to a bikeshare operator in Hamilton, Ontario, Canada.

== Related programs ==
=== Biketown WHQ ===
Not part of the Biketown PDX service, but sharing some aspects, is a private bike-sharing program for employees of Nike in the Beaverton area, where Nike's world headquarters is located. As of 2016, the program had already been in place "for years", but was recently renamed Biketown WHQ. The suffix, standing for World Headquarters, is intended to differentiate the program from the public Biketown PDX service in Portland. The City of Portland owns the rights to the "Biketown" name, but gave Nike permission to use it for its program. It has a fleet of 400 bicycles, which company employees can use to go between any of Nike's several Beaverton-area facilities. In 2016, when Nike signed a 10-year sponsorship contract with Portland for the latter's new bike-sharing service, it also purchased for its own service new bicycles of the same design (and color: orange) as used on the Biketown PDX service, from Social Bicycles. However, the Biketown WHQ program is operated by Holy Spokes, a Portland bike shop, rather than by Motivate.

== See also ==
- Cycling in Portland, Oregon
- List of bicycle-sharing systems
