= Upway =

Online refurbished electric bicycle retailer

- Industry: Electric bicycles
- Founded: 2021
- Founders: Stéphane Ficaja; Toussaint Wattinne
- Headquarters: Gennevilliers, France
- Number of locations: Paris (France), Berlin & Düsseldorf (Germany), Mechelen (Belgium), New York City & Los Angeles (USA)
- Products: Reconditioned e-bikes
- Number of employees: 450
- Website: upway.co

Upway is an online marketplace for refurbished electric bicycles, operating in several European countries and the United States and now the world's leading electric bike refurbisher. Founded in 2021 by former Uber executives Toussaint Wattinne and Stéphane Ficaja, the company buys pre-owned e-bikes from individuals, retailers, and manufacturers, reconditions them at dedicated facilities known as UpCenters, and resells them through its website.

The company has raised venture capital funding from firms including Sequoia Capital, Exor Ventures, and Korelya Capital, supporting its expansion from France to Germany, Belgium, and the United States between 2022 and 2025. Industry analysts have linked Upway’s growth to increasing demand for e-bikes in Europe and North America, particularly in the secondhand market.

Upway has been covered in European and U.S. business and cycling media for its role in promoting reuse and extending the lifespan of electric bicycles. In 2024, it was nominated for the Rider’s Choice Awards in the Best Retail Sales & Maintenance Company category.

== History ==
Upway was founded by Toussaint Wattinne and Stéphane Ficaja, two ex-Uber executives, in July 2021 in Paris, France. The pair worked in operations at Uber, with positions as Regional General Managers of the North America and Northern & Eastern Europe markets. Wattinne and Ficaja quit their roles around the same time and decided to start a new entrepreneurial adventure focused on electric bikes, inspired by Wattinne’s then-recent cycling trip across the United Kingdom with his wife that summer.

In response to the high cost of new e-bikes and the lack of reliability in the secondhand market, Wattinne and Ficaja founded Upway, a startup marketplace for refurbished electric bikes. After successful fundraising campaigns in 2022 and 2023, the company grew from its original headquarters in Paris and opened additional centers across Europe and the US. There are currently UpCenters in Paris (4,000 sq m), Berlin (4,000 sq m), Düsseldorf (9,000 sq m), Illingen (10,500 sq m), Mechelen (3,500 sq m), Amsterdam (7,000 sq m), New York (3,500 sq m), and Los Angeles (3,500 sq m)

== Funding ==
In 2021, the company secured $5 million seed round of funding led by Sequoia Capital and Global Founders Capital, establishing plans to expand beyond France to other European markets.

In May 2022, Upway raised $25 million in Series A round funding from investors co-led by US-based Sequoia Capital and Exor Ventures from the Netherlands. These backers were joined by Global Founders Capital, Transition VC, and angel investor Henri Moissinac— the investment was to be used for expanding Upway’s operations in Germany, the Netherlands, and the upcoming entrance into the US by late 2022 or early 2023.

In the later part of 2023, Upway secured an additional $30 million Series B round funding led by Korelya Capital, bringing its total funding raised to date to $60 million.

In November 2025, Upway secured an additional $60 million in a Series C round led by Denmark-based A.P. Moller Holding to support its expansion across the US and Europe.

== Products ==
Upway’s product inventory includes various types of electric bikes from over 200 brands, including mountain, cargo, folding, road, gravel, and city e-bikes. Sub-categories include step-through, fat tire, lightweight, and commuter models. Popular brands include Specialized, Trek, Cannondale, Riese & Müller, Aventon, Rad Power Bikes, and Gazelle. Upway also sells accessories such as batteries, chargers, locks, lights, helmets, child seats, and bike bags.

Upway sources e-bikes from different channels: directly from manufacturers, bicycle shops, and individuals who sell their used e-bikes to Upway online. Individuals can also trade in their e-bike in person at Upway’s partner bike shops.

Each bicycle is processed at an UpCenter facility, where mechanics inspect and recondition components such as tires, brakes, and drivetrains. Batteries that fall below 80 percent capacity are typically replaced, and the refurbished bicycles are listed for sale on Upway’s online platform with a one-year warranty covering the frame, motor, and electrical system.

In its first full year of operation in 2022, the company reported reconditioning more than 5,000 bicycles, a figure that grew to over 20,000 units by the end of 2023. Upway now works with more than 3,000 partner stores worldwide, representing over 200 brands, and offers the world’s largest selection of refurbished electric bikes.

== Markets & UpCenters ==
As of 2025, operates in 9 countries (France, Germany, the Netherlands, Belgium, Switzerland, Austria, Spain, Italy, and the United States) through its 8 upcenters (Paris, Mechelen, Berlin, Amsterdam, Düsseldorf, Illingen, New York City, and Los Angeles). Upway expanded rapidly in response to the fast-growing e-bike market in Europe and the increased popularity of e-bikes in the US. E-bikes were the lead driver of growth in the US bicycle industry from 2019 to 2024.

The first UpCenter and company headquarters was opened in Gennevilliers, France, near Paris in 2021, handling operations for European markets. Upway opened the doors of its first UpCenter in Belgium in Mechelen in March 2024, with the capacity to inspect and refurbish approximately 2,000 electric bikes every month and a team of around 65 employees. The strategic location of the new UpCenter in Flanders facilitates partnerships with Dutch brands like Gazelle and Cube, which dominate the refurbished e-bike market.

Upway entered the German market in 2022 with its first UpCenter in Berlin. Germany is the company’s largest and fastest-growing market—in both sourcing and sales. After establishing a strong presence, Upway expanded with a second UpCenter in Düsseldorf in 2025, and a third in Illingen near Stuttgart in 2026, bringing the total number of UpCenters worldwide to 8. This demonstrates Upway’s commitment to the German market through significant investment and confidence. To date, Upway has refurbished and sold 45,000 e-bikes in Germany. By doubling the size of its management team and tripling the size of its bike mechanics team by 2027, Upway aims to refurbish 100,000 bikes in Germany within that period—and 300,000 e-bikes overall by 2030.

Upway officially entered the US market in 2023. In May 2023, the e-bike startup opened its first US-based UpCenter in New York City, located in Brooklyn. Upway expanded by launching a second UpCenter in Redondo Beach, California in 2025. A bi-coastal distribution of Upway’s UpCenters allows for significantly faster and more efficient sourcing logistics and shipping.

== Reception and impact ==
Upway has experienced relatively rapid growth since its founding in 2021 and continues to support sustainability efforts by refurbishing electric bikes that are already in use. Upway was nominated for the 2024 Rider’s Choice Awards under the Best Retail Sales & Maintenance Company category.

In the US market, Upway partners with more than 500 retail bike shops for its trade-in program. Upway is also an approved retailer participating in e-bike incentive programs in various US states, such as Minnesota and California, to encourage e-bike ridership.
