= Cycling in Seattle =

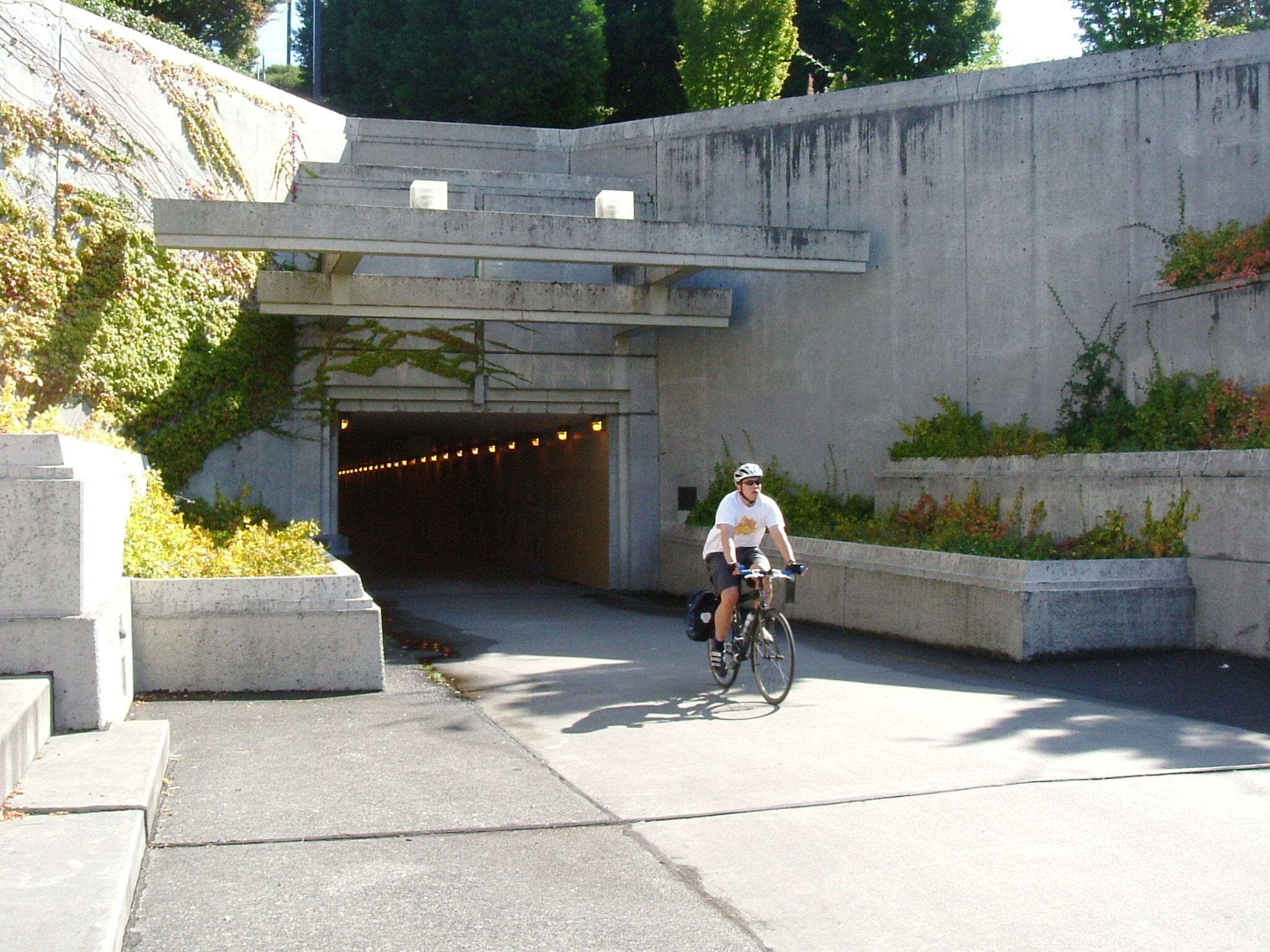
Cyclist exiting the Mount Baker Ridge Tunnel on the Interstate 90 trail

In 2012, 50% of people in Seattle had access to a working bike and 30% biked regularly. In 2026, Seattle led the country in bike commuting miles. Seattle consistently ranks highly in lists of bikeable large cities.

The Seattle Department of Transportation operates a network of bicycle counters, these have shown significant and accelerating cycling growth since the Covid pandemic ridership dip.

== History ==
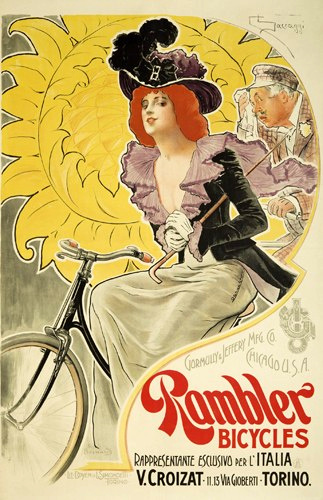
Rambler bicycles, represented in this circa 1981 poster were among the first popular safety bicycles in Seattle

In the second half of the 1800s, bicycles were already becoming popular in Europe and the eastern United States. Seattle was late to adopting the bicycle but early to build dedicated infrastructure for it. The first official bike path was built on Second Avenue in 1897.

In 1968, the first Bicycle Sunday was held on Lake Washington Boulevard which was first created as a bicycle path. The project is now called Bicycle Weekends and as of 2026, closes the road to non-emergency vehicles for 33 days of the year.

In 1973 Glenn Erickson and Angel Rodriguez founded Rodriguez Bicycles, now R+E Cycles, a shop specializing in custom, tandem and racing bikes built in Seattle. Staff at the store also now make bikes built with S&S couplers so they can be quickly disassembled for travel. For a tandem, the couplers enable accommodating different numbers of pedaling riders on the same bike, between one and five.

In 2007, Rad Power Bikes was founded. The Seattle-based E-bike company uses direct-to-consumer strategies and tries to position itself as more reputable in that affordable market. The company suffered bankruptcy after needing to recall over 100,000 faulty E-bike batteries that had a low but significant risk of combusting. The company was bought out and is now legally Rad Life Mobility though the new bikes are still sold under the original name.

Second Avenue still has a dedicated bike lane through downtown Seattle as of 2026.

== Bike network and greenways ==
Bike lanes intersecting at Broadway and Pine in Capitol Hill

=== Bike lane network ===
Seattle was historically early to implementing cycling-specific infrastructure, having built a notable bike lane network for the region, ranging from sharrows to two-way Toronto-barrier protected lanes. In 2014 the bike network was 135 miles (217 km) In 2025 and 2026, the network was still quickly expanding and being upgraded with better protection.

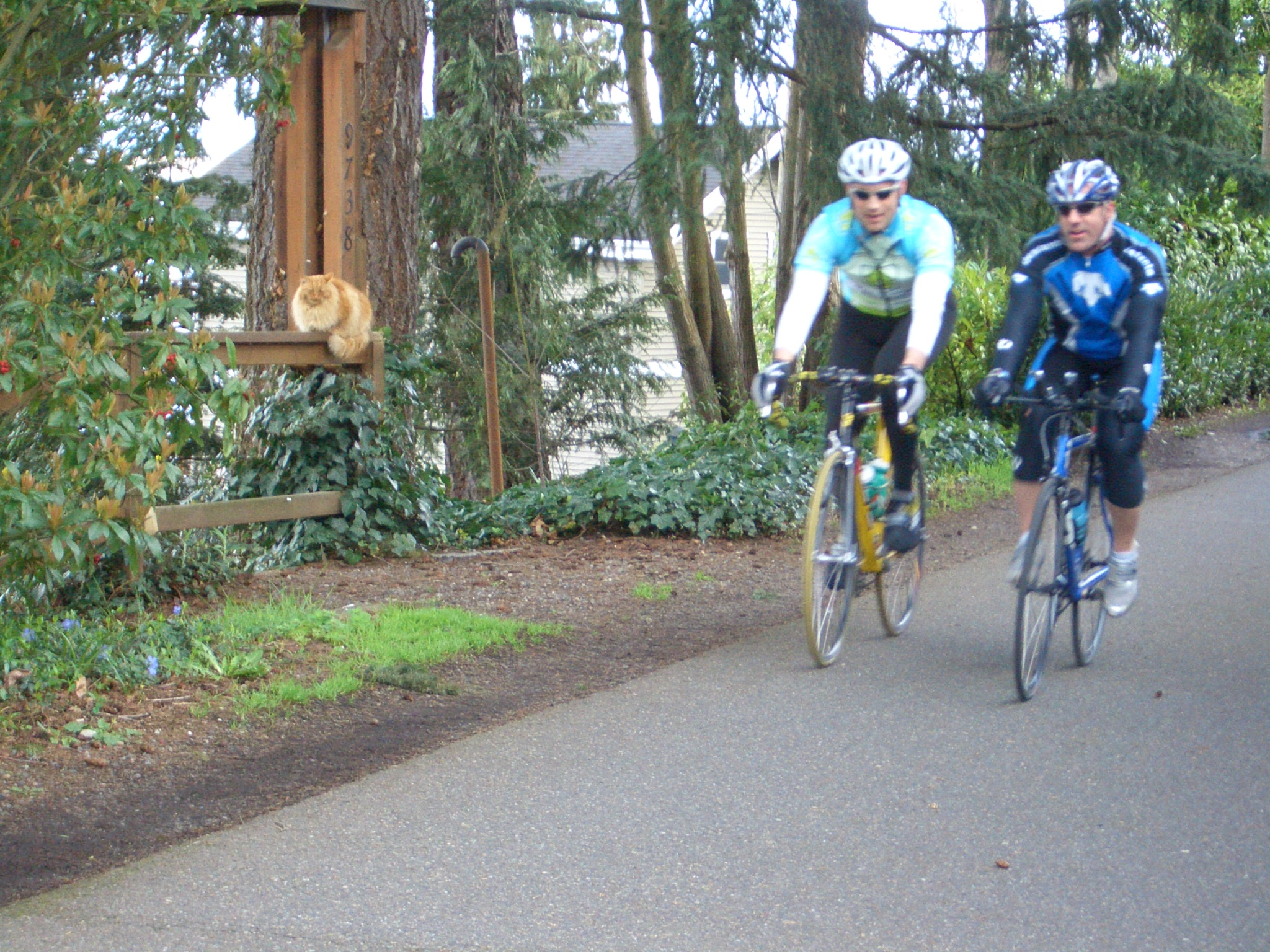
Two cyclists and a cat enjoy the Burke-Gilman trail

=== Greenways ===
The Seattle metropolitan area is home to many rails-to-trails multi-use paths. Some of these rail trails have replaced the railway and other rails with trails ride alongside active train tracks. There are also neighborhood greenways and healthy streets which are routes through the city that have been chosen as particularly suitable for biking because of slow traffic speeds, gentle grades, and beautiful trees. These streets are given signage as well as traffic flow and safety improvements including traffic calming.

== Bike and scooter share ==
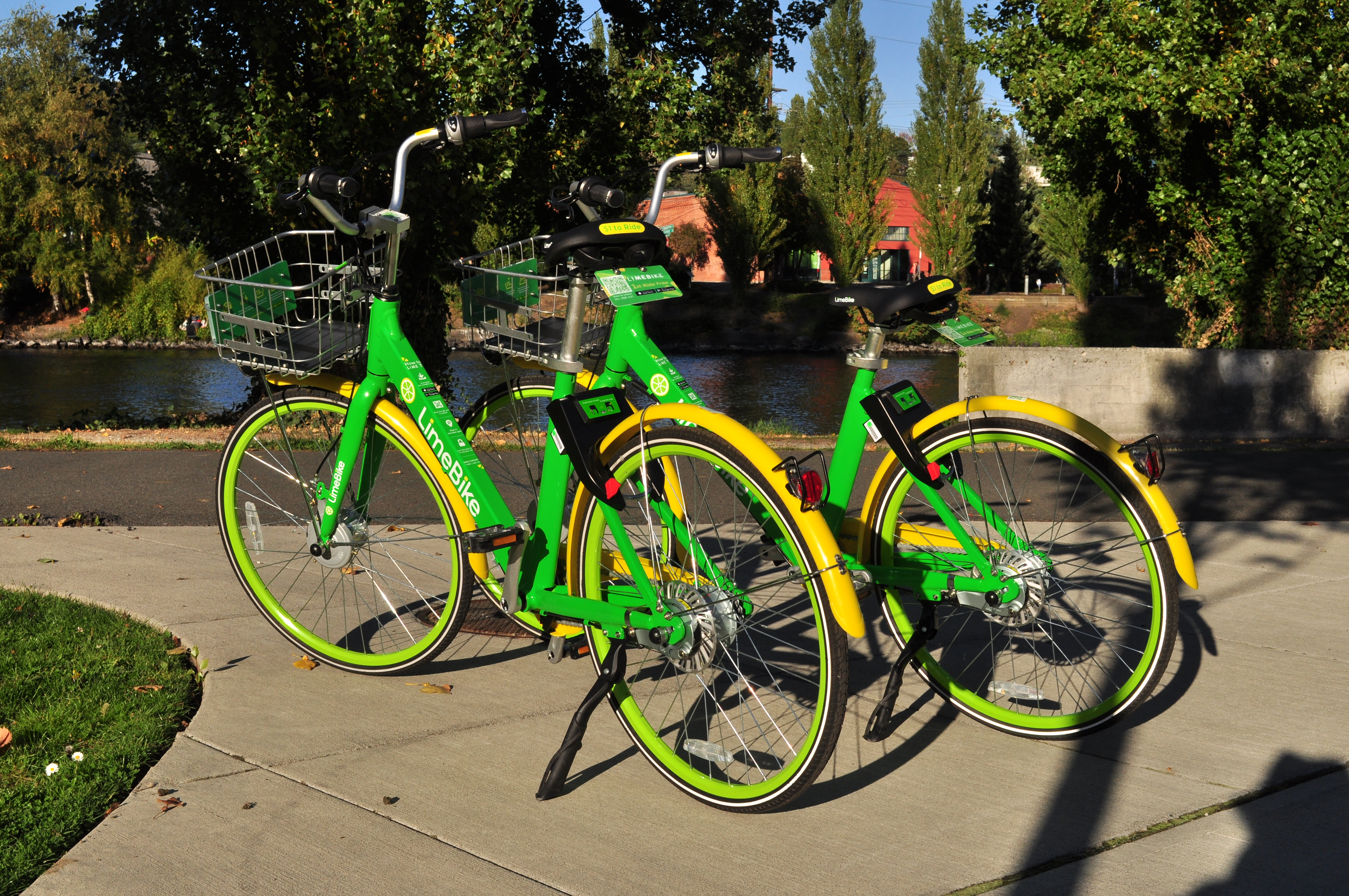
Bike share bikes, before they all became electric

Seattle has had some form of bicycle-sharing system since the launch of Pronto Cycle Share in 2014. Currently, two companies offer short-term rentable bikes, Lime (e-bikes, scooters, and moped-like scooters) and Wombi (longtail cargo bikes). Seattle was the first city to host a dockless system, allowing bikes to be parked anywhere that didn't limit use of the sidewalk. While some found the system convenient, others complained of accessibility issues. Injuries have also been an issue, with some blaming, in particular, the upright, small-wheeled E-scooters. City staff have attempted to alleviate the blocked sidewalk concerns by adding painted corrals with signs. They have also released guides on how best to park bikes as well as how to report bikes that pose a pedestrian hazard. One company designed their bikes with Seattle in mind, opting for gears and later, electric motors to assist with Seattle's hilly, glacier-formed terrain.

The city releases reports on the system's usage including number of trips taken. As of November 2026 the highest ridership was 83,000 bike share trips in a single day during the 2026 FIFA World Cup.

== Public transport ==
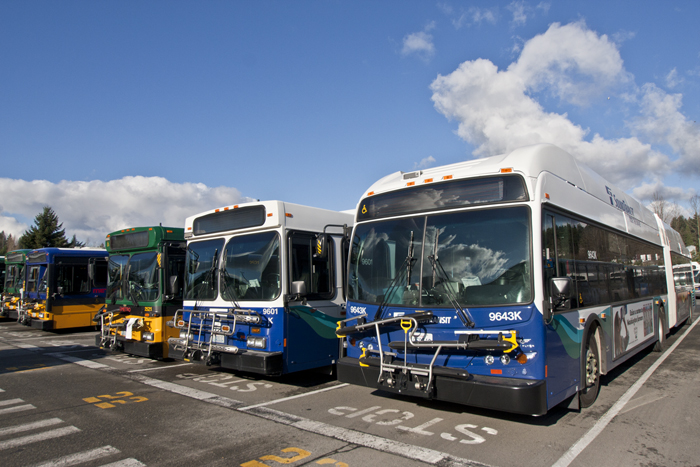
King County Metro and Sound Transit busses with front racks sit ready for use at a bus base

Bicycles are generally allowed on public busses, trains, ferries, monorails, and streetcars in Seattle with few exceptions. Both King County Metro and Sound Transit, among others, operate busses with bike racks on the front or inside the bus. Bicycles weighing more than 50–75 pounds (23–34 kg) are not allowed on some busses or trains. E-bikes are generally allowed and can often be made significantly lighter by removing the battery. Most major transit stations have secure bike rooms and/or individual bike lockers.

== Sports ==
Seattleites invented hardcourt bike polo in the early 2000s.

== Mountain biking ==
There are places in the city limits that are expressly designed for mountain biking including the I-5 Colonnade park which was developed with the assistance of the Evergreen Mountain Bike Alliance and has been called the first of its kind.

== Community advocacy ==
Seattle has shown a strong cycling culture with various groups working to promote biking and improve the cycling experience. Seattlites participate monthly in the global Critical Mass bike ride which is both a parade and a protest. Other rides in the city include Cranksgiving, Wold Naked Bike Ride, Obliteride, Dead Baby Bikes Downhill, and the 200+ mile Seattle to Portland Bicycle Classic. There are also nearby rides including Ride Around Mount Rainier in One Day.

== See also ==
- Cycling in the United States
- Cascade Bicycle Club – advocacy and ride organizing group
- Solstice Cyclists – clothing-optional bike ride
- Utility cycling – riding, especially in cities, for transportation
