= The Street Trust =

American non-profit organization

- Formation: 1990; 36 years ago
- Founders: Rex Burkholder
- Founded at: Portland, Oregon
- Type: Nonprofit
- Tax ID no.: 93-1057956
- Executive director: Sarah Iannarone
- Revenue: $963,092 (2018)
- Website: www.thestreettrust.org
- Formerly called: Bicycle Transportation Alliance

The Street Trust (formerly the Bicycle Transportation Alliance) is a 501(c)(3) non-profit advocacy organization based in Portland, Oregon, United States. The Street Trust advocates for the safety and ease of biking, walking and riding public transit in communities. The organization does legislative work at the statewide and national levels and endorses legislation and ballot measures. It successfully lobbied Portland's mass transit company, TriMet, to accommodate bicycles on buses and prevailed in a lawsuit to uphold Oregon's Bicycle Bill.

Originally incorporated as the Bicycle Transportation Alliance in 1991, the organization changed its name to The Street Trust in January 2017.

== History and advocacy ==
The Street Trust had its origins as the Portland Area Bicycle Coalition, a volunteer group founded in 1991 after a resident was not allowed to bring his bike on board a TriMet bus. The group submitted a petition with over 5000 signatures to local authorities requesting that buses be equipped with bike racks. Following its success, the coalition incorporated as a not-for-profit organization and changed its name to the Bicycle Transportation Alliance.

The organization filed a lawsuit against the city in 1993, Bicycle Transportation Alliance v. City of Portland. The suit argued that bicycle provisions were required for new roadway provisions under the 1971 Oregon Bicycle Bill. The Bicycle Transportation Alliance succeeded in 1995, compelling the City of Portland to provide bike lanes on new streets in the Rose Quarter. In the case, Oregon Court of Appeals further found that the provision in the Bicycle Bill "establishes an annual spending 'floor' of one percent" which governments must spend on facilities for bicycles.

Following the success, the BTA was able to influence the outcome of the measures taken by the Portland Bureau of Transportation through its participation in stakeholder working groups and advisory committees. In 2009, the organization lobbied in favor of allowing Idaho stops under Oregon law. By 2011, the organization had begun issuing a 'bike-friendly report card' comparing the bicycle-friendliness of Oregon cities. The report card was later expanded to apply to the entire United States. The Bicycle Transportation Alliance also supported efforts to introduce a bicycle tax in Oregon, saying that it would increase the influence of cyclists.

In 2016, the BTA announced it was changing its name to The Street Trust, reflecting an expansion of its mission to encompass pedestrians and transit users as well as cyclists. At the same time, it sought a 501(c)(4) designation, which would permit it to endorse political candidates. The name change was finalized in January 2017.

In 2021, The Street Trust was one of the main organization's supporting an amendment to the Oregon Bicycle Bill to improve the composition of the Oregon Bicycle and Pedestrian Advisory Committee and increase funding for bicycle trails and footpaths in Oregon.

The Street Trust's bicycle boulevards campaign is working to create a comprehensive network of low-traffic streets in order to improve safety and increase bicycle ridership. It has led other campaigns including the For Every Kid Campaign that sought dedicated funding for safe routes to school in the Metropolitan Portland region.

== Leadership ==
Sarah Iannarone was named executive director of The Street Trust in January 2021. Rob Sadowsky served as executive director for five years before he was fired in 2017.

== Programs ==
Safe Routes to School is a collaboration with Oregon Walks that seeks to increase the number of children walking and bicycling to school. The partnership provides technical advice and assistance for Oregon communities. The Street Trust, along with Oregon Walks, received a pedestrian safety grant in 2008 from the Oregon Department of Transportation (ODOT).

The Street Trust developed a Bike Safety and Awareness Program, which conducts courses in bicycle safety in fourth through seventh-grade classrooms. The bicycle safety program is supported by ODOT.

The organization donated 32 bicycles valued at about $5,000 in total to the Central Point Police Department's bicycle safety program in March 2008.

=== Annual events ===
The Street Trust sponsors the Bike More Challenge, an annual challenge to workplaces and individual cyclists to commute by bicycle to work during the month of September. According to BikePortland, a local bicycle blog, the Challenge started in 1995 and as of 2016 included over 1200 participant businesses and more than 11,000 cyclists.

The Street Trust presents the annual Alice Awards (formerly Alice B. Toeclips Awards), recognizing individuals, businesses, and organizations in Oregon and southwest Washington whose work has supported the organization's mission.

== See also ==
- Cycling in Portland, Oregon
