= St. Sharbel Maronite Catholic Church =

Church in Portland, Oregon

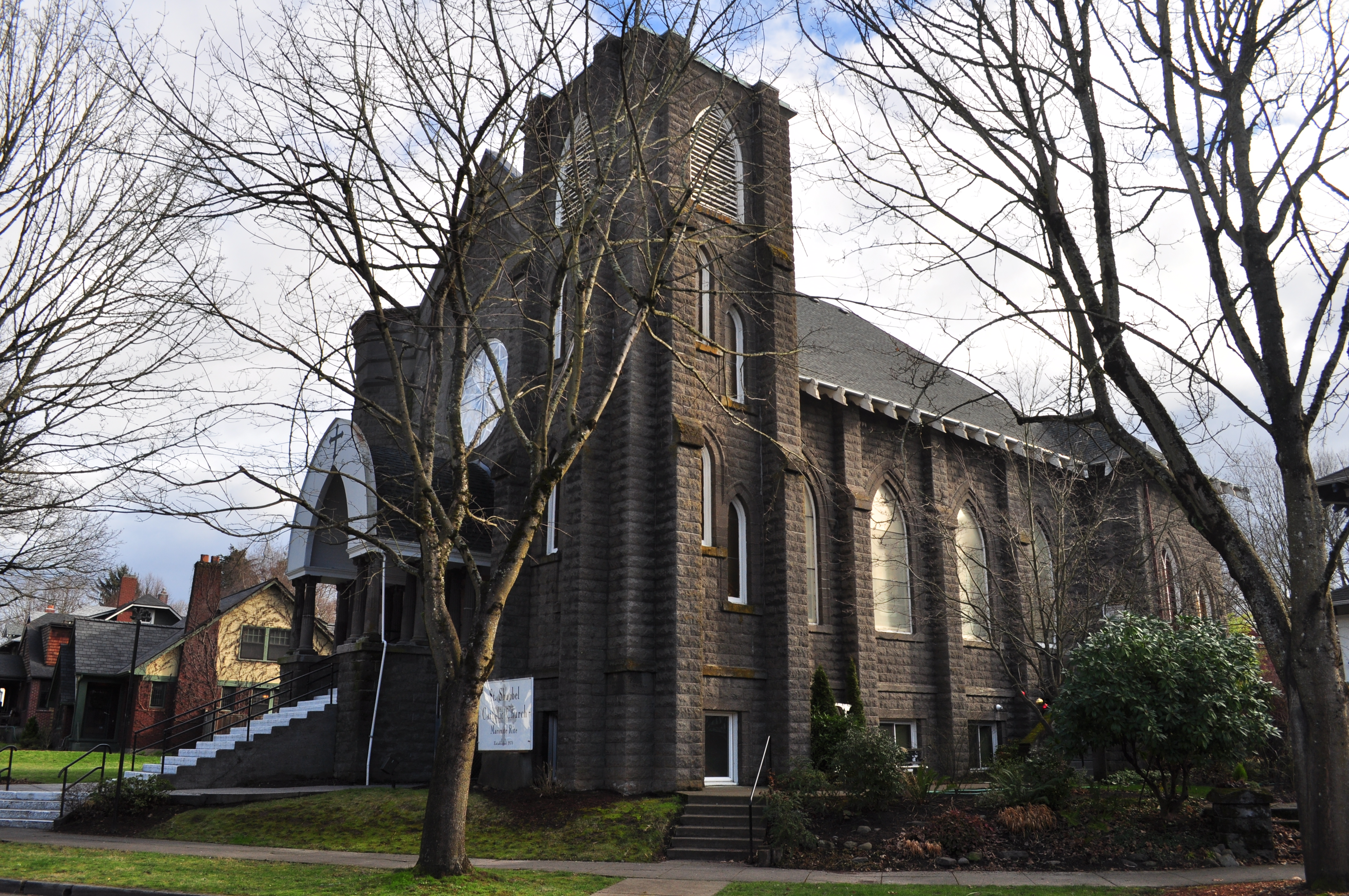
- Interactive map of the St. Sharbel Maronite Catholic Church area

General information
- Location: 1804 SE 16th Avenue; Portland, Oregon
- Completed: 1909
- First United Evangelical Church
- U.S. Historic district – Contributing property
- Location within Portland, Oregon
- Coordinates: 45°30′36″N 122°38′57″W
- Architect: Alfred H. Faber
- Architectural style: Gothic Revival
- Part of: Ladd's Addition Historic District (ID88001310)
- Designated CP: August 31, 1988

St. Sharbel Maronite Catholic Church (originally First United Evangelical Church) is a building found in the Ladd's Addition in Portland, Oregon. It was the first of seven churches built in the historic neighborhood and features the Gothic Revival style. The building has accommodated several different congregations throughout its existence; today it serves the Eastern Catholic Maronite Church.

== History ==
The church, designed primarily in the Gothic Revival style by Alfred H. Faber, was built in 1909 under the name First United Evangelical Church as part of the first developmental period of Ladd's Addition. The church was among the first non-residential buildings constructed in the district, helping transform it from a set of loosely connected residences to a proper neighborhood and community with varied building typology. Today, it still dominates the northern park of Ladd's Addition as the only non-residential structure facing it.

The First United Evangelical Church (led by Reverend H. A. Deck) occupied the church until 1930, when it was renamed the Cornerstone Church under a new congregation. It was later changed again to the Bethel Missionary Temple, followed by the current Maronite congregation. The dedication is to Saint Sharbel (or Charbel) Makhlouf.

In 1988, the building was named a primary contributing property in the National Register of Historic Places listing of the Ladd's Addition Historic District, under its original name.

== Description ==
The construction is of concrete block with cast stone cladding. The front exterior includes two asymmetrical towers: the northwest tower is of polygonal design while that to the southwest is square with flat buttresses and once featured a steeply pitched bell tower before its removal around the 1950s. A stained-glass rose window dominates the front gable with exposed rafters continuing on all sides of the structure. A set of 16 Ionic columns holds up the entry arch, a feature also present in nearby homes designed by Faber.

== See also ==
- Culture of Portland, Oregon
- Religion in Portland, Oregon
