= Brian Borrello =

American artist

- Occupation: Artist

Brian Borrello is an American artist. Originally from New Orleans, he is based in Portland, Oregon.

== Works ==
- Guns in the Hands of Artists
- People's Bike Library of Portland, Portland, Oregon (2009)
- Silicon Forest, Portland, Oregon
- Corylus, Tigard, Oregon

== See also ==
- List of people from New Orleans
- List of people from Portland, Oregon
