= Ladds 500 =

Annual cycling event in Portland, Oregon, U.S.

- Logo

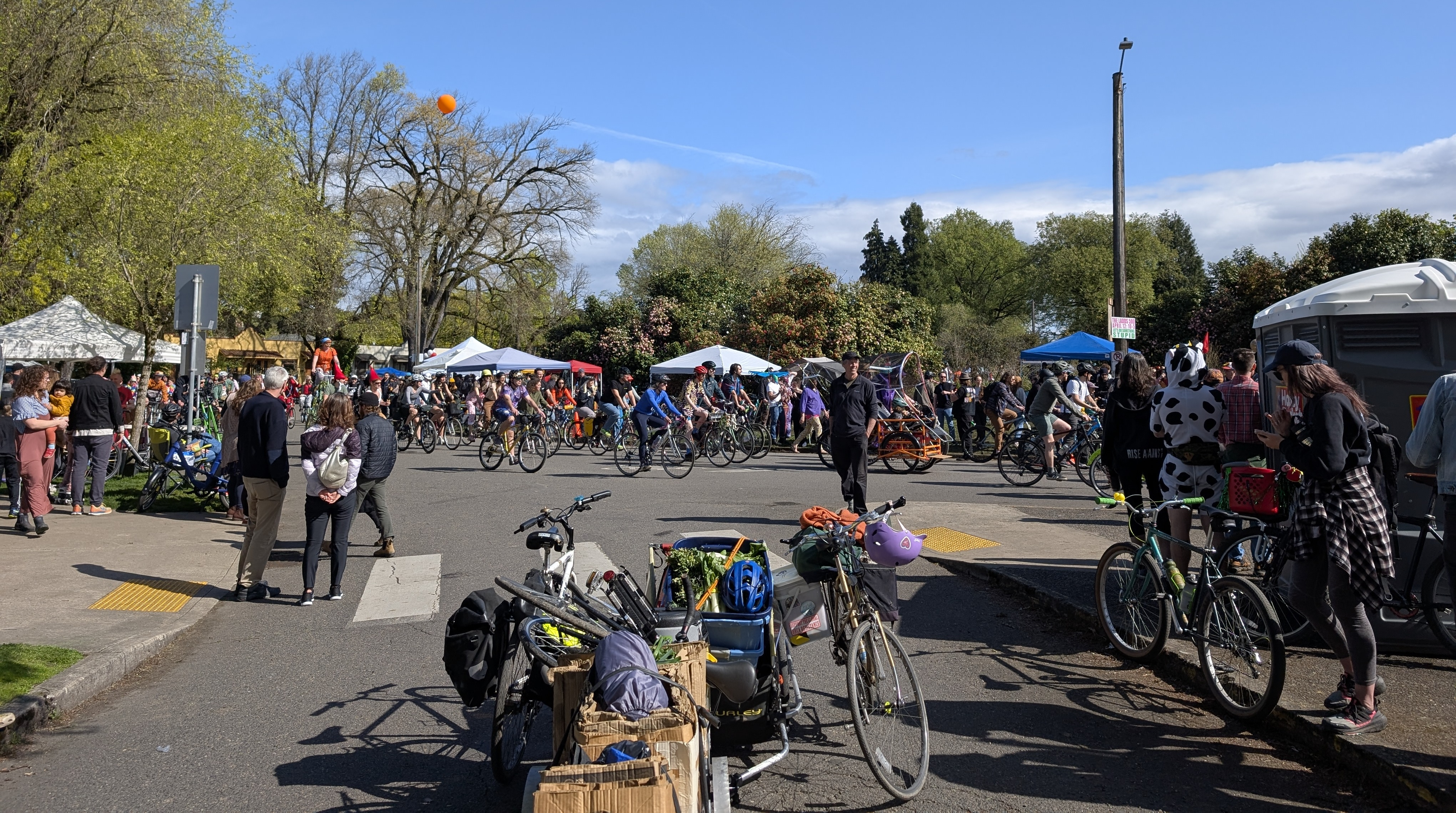
- The event in 2025
- Status: Active
- Frequency: Annually
- Venue: Ladd's Addition
- Location: Portland, Oregon
- Coordinates: 45.508541°N 122.649415°W
- Country: United States
- Inaugurated: 2016
- Founder: David Barstow Robinson
- Participants: Hundreds (2025, 2026)
- Website: ladds500.com

The Ladds 500 (sometimes Ladd's 500) is an annual cycling event in Portland, Oregon, United States. Founded by David Barstow Robinson in 2016, the event involves cyclists traveling around a traffic circle in the Ladd's Addition district of southeast Portland's Hosford-Abernethy neighborhood 500 times. It is typically held on the Saturday after the second Friday in April; its latest event was on April 11, 2026.

== Description ==
The purpose of the non-competitive annual cycling event is to travel around a traffic circle in the Ladd's Addition district of southeast Portland's Hosford-Abernethy neighborhood 500 times, either individually or as part of a team. The free event has been described as a "relay" and not a race. According to the organizer, 500 laps is a century, or 100 miles. Portland Monthly has included the Ladds 500 in a list of fifteen "essential" annual bike events in the city and said, "Riders form relay teams and 'turn left for a while,' while non-riders party in the middle." The event operates as a project of fiscal sponsor Umbrella 501(c)(3), is funded by donations, and run by volunteers. The phrase "It's spring, let's do something stupid" (or simply "Let's do something stupid") is part of the event's marketing. The event is held annually on the Saturday after the second Friday in April.

== History ==
The event was founded by David Barstow Robinson. Approximately 40 people participated in the first event in 2016. By 2025, the event attracted hundreds of participants. It has become popular enough that a permit from the Portland Bureau of Transportation is obtained to temporarily shut down vehicular traffic around the park where the event takes place. Hundreds attended the 2026 event on April 11.

== See also ==
- Culture of Portland, Oregon
- Transportation in Portland, Oregon
