= Silicon Forest (sculpture) =

Sculpture in Portland, Oregon

- Artist: Brian Borrello
- Year: 2003
- Type: Sculpture
- Medium: Stainless steel; LED lights
- Subject: Trees
- Location: Portland, Oregon, United States; 45.53005°N 122.66769°W

Silicon Forest, sometimes referred to as The Silicon Forest, is an outdoor 2003 sculpture by Brian Borrello, installed near the Interstate/Rose Quarter station in Portland, Oregon's Lloyd District, in the United States.

== Description and reception ==
Brian Borrello's Silicon Forest (2003) is an abstract sculpture made of stainless steel and light-emitting diode (LED) lights, installed at Interstate/Rose Quarter station in Portland's Lloyd District. It depicts a series of trees with thin trunks and cone-shaped foliage. The piece has been called a "three-part metaphor for displacement and change". The solar artwork's steel trees illuminate using electricity powered by solar panels.

In 2013, Solar Power World's Frank Andorka ranked the sculpture third in his list of "11 Must-See Art Installations, Inspired by Solar Panels".

== See also ==
- 2003 in art
- LED art
- Light art
