= Guns in the Hands of Artists =

External videos
- Guns in the Hands of Artists Brian Borrello walkthrough (March 30, 2015), Vimeo

Guns in the Hands of Artists is an art exhibit and project conceived by Brian Borrello in the mid 1990s, which was later converted to a book.

== History ==
The "Guns in the Hands of Artists" project was conceived by artist Brian Borrello in the mid 1990s, and started in 1996; the exhibit saw artists convert decommissioned guns into artworks as an expression of gun violence in the United States. Borrello acquired decommissioned guns obtained through a trade-in program, then gave them to New Orleans–based artists, who converted them into artworks in a variety of media, including fashion, photography, and sculpture. The exhibit showcased at Positive Space Gallery, which was operated by Jonathan Ferrara. Borrello relocated to Portland, Oregon, where he executed another iteration of the exhibit. completed other versions of the project in Shreveport, Louisiana, and Washington, D.C.

In 2014, Ferrara organized an exhibit at his New Orleans gallery, which is now known as Jonathan Ferrara Gallery. According to Borrello, he and Ferrara worked together on the updated exhibit, though Ferrara disputes this claim. Ferrara worked with local government officials and the police department to secure 186 decommissioned guns acquired by the city's gun buyback program. More than 30 artists participated in the exhibit, and used a variety of media, including glassblowing, painting, photography, and sculpture. Borrello created a sculpture for the show in the form of an "absurdly long ammunition clip to an automatic pistol, grimly implying that the supply of death was unlimited".

The exhibit was later converted into book form, with contributions by Lupe Fiasco, Gabby Giffords, and Tim Kaine, among others. The book, which includes an essay by Borrello, was produced by Ferrara to document the exhibit. Ferrara also established the Guns in the Hands of Artists Foundation to continue the exhibit's mission.

Borrello took issue with Ferrara's actions and criticized him for "taking liberties with the fundamental ideas" behind the project and creating a foundation with a board of directors. Furthermore, according to Borrello, the exhibit was never intended to be affiliated with any specific commercial entity, and was meant to serve as an ongoing collaborative project. Borrello has expressed disapproval of Ferrara's application for a trademark on the title "Guns in the Hands of Artists". Borrello said, "I see it as a hostile takeover of my project. I came up with the name. It's clear that it was my love child." Contrastingly, the foundation's website infers a partnership and says, "The Guns in the Hands of Artists Foundation stems from an ongoing arts project begun in 1996 by Gallery Owner Jonathan Ferrara and artist Brian Borrello."
