= Oregon Bicycle Bill =

American transport legislation

The Oregon Bicycle Bill (ORS 366.514) is transportation legislation passed in the U.S. state of Oregon in 1971. It requires the inclusion of facilities for pedestrians and bicyclists wherever a road, street or highway is being constructed or reconstructed and applies to the Oregon Department of Transportation (ODOT) as well as Oregon cities and counties.

The law requires that in any given fiscal year, a minimum of 1% of the state highway fund received by the ODOT, a city or county is used to provide walkways and bikeways located within the right-of-way of public roads, streets or highways open to motor vehicle traffic.

== History ==
Governor McCall signs the bill into law

In 1971, Don Stathos, a Republican state representative and avid bicyclist from Jacksonville, sponsored House Bill 1700. Nine representatives and one state senator originally backed the bicycle bill. At each stage of the legislative process, the bill passed by one vote. Initially, Governor Tom McCall didn't favor the bill, but changed his mind as he came to believe it was good for Oregon and Oregonians. The governor signed the bill into law on the seat of a Schwinn Paramount.

The bill allowed for the creation of the Oregon Bicycle and Pedestrian Advisory Committee, a governor-appointed committee that meets quarterly. The committee awards grants that provide approximately $5 million every two years for the design and construction of bicycle and pedestrian facilities. Grants are awarded to Oregon cities and counties through the ODOT Pedestrian and Bicycle Grant Program.
