= Dead Baby Bikes Downhill =

American bicycle race

Dead Baby Bikes Downhill, also known as Dead Baby Bike Race or Dead Baby Downhill or RaceDay, is an annual Seattle-based bicycle race and street party that occurs on the first Saturday of August. The bicycle race often has no defined route, just an origin and an ending point, and has historically not been permitted, even though the accompanying street party has been permitted.

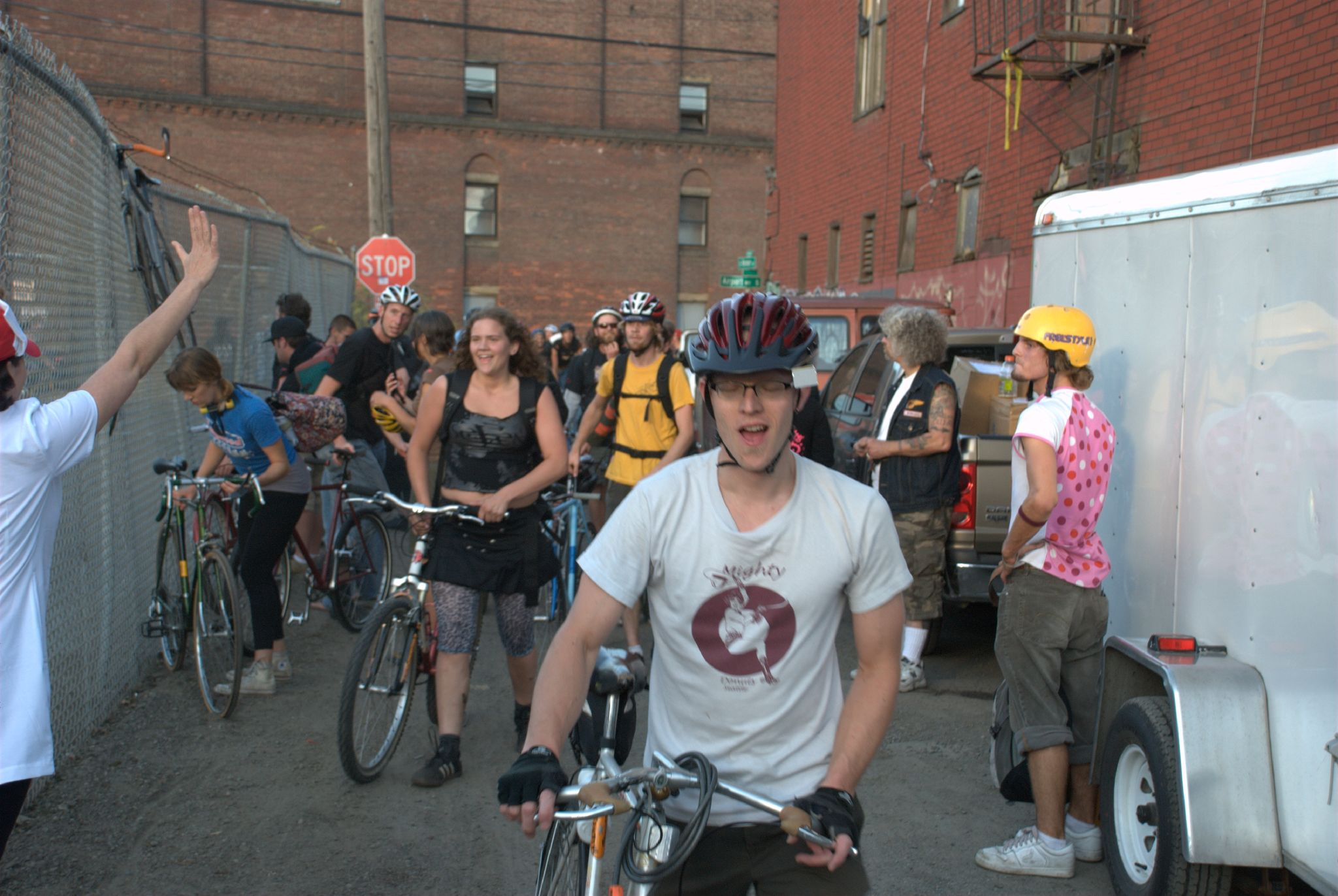
Participants at the end of the 2007 Dead Baby

Over the years, the event has grown from attracting hundreds to now thousands of people to various Seattle neighborhoods, lately in Georgetown where the clubhouse is currently located.

The street party at times features carnival rides made of bicycle parts, as well as bicycle jousting.

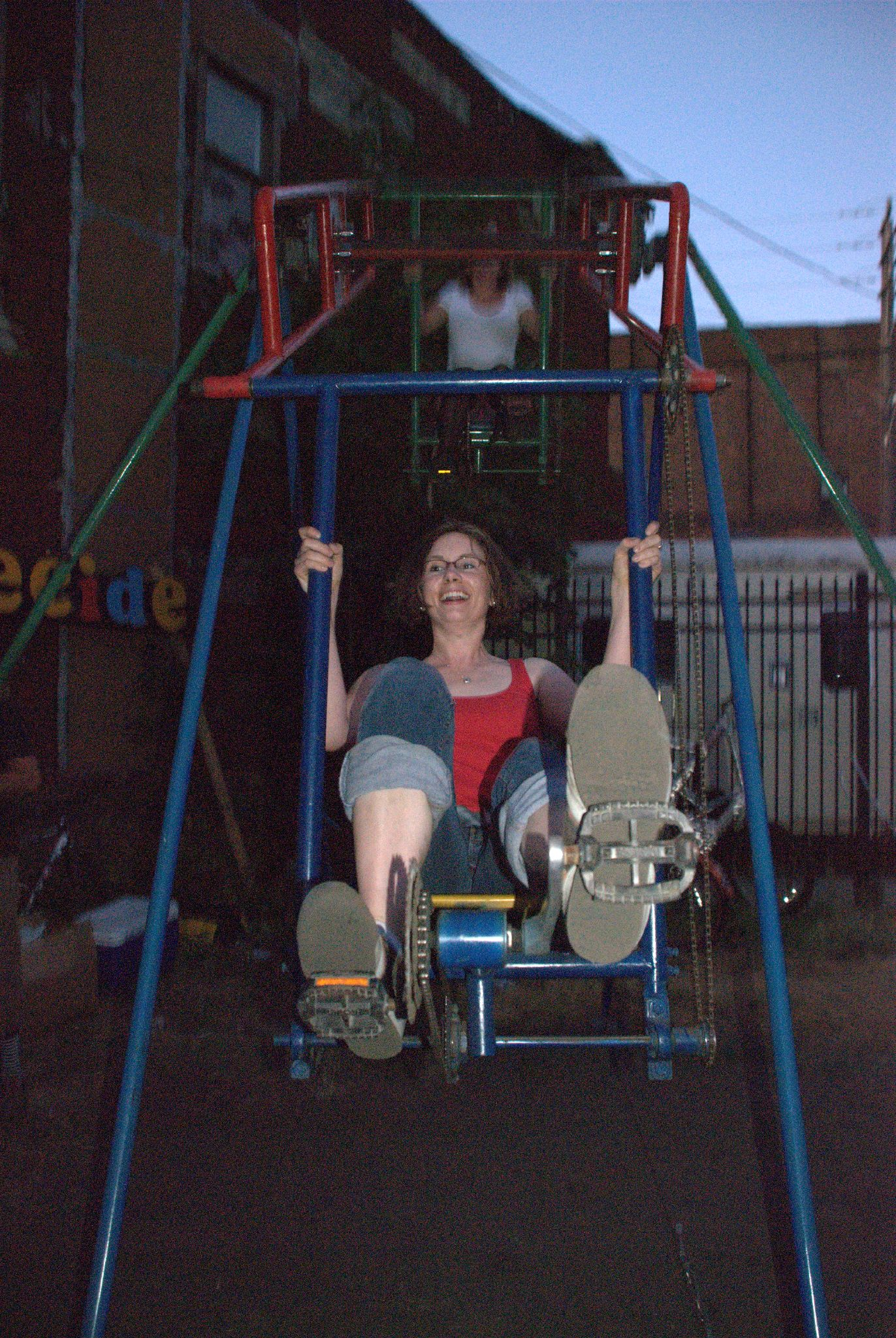
A "Ferris Wheel" carnival ride made of bicycle parts by Cyclecide

The event was featured in a 2005 episode of the television show Grey's Anatomy.

== History ==
The event was started in 1997 by the members of Dead Baby Bikes, a Seattle bicycle club named for a doll which had been nailed to the wall of the roll-up door of the bike repair shop they used as a meeting space. The club existed for many years before the race. Club founder Dave Ranstrom admitted that if he had known the event would draw media attention, he would have chosen a different name.

The first ride included some of the repair shop employees and their friends but by 2004 grew to an event attended by 400 people. The event continues to be held as of 2026.
