= Portland Sunday Parkways =

Cycling event series in Portland, Oregon, U.S.

- Logo in 2026
- Location: Portland, Oregon
- Country: United States
- Inaugurated: 2008
- Organiser: Portland Bureau of Transportation

Portland Sunday Parkways is a series of cycling events operated by the Portland Bureau of Transportation (PBOT) in Portland, Oregon, United States. Established in 2008, the event has been described as a "bike and pedestrian takeover of neighborhood streets" and attracts thousands of participants. The event is inspired by the tradition of open streets in Latin America. According to Taylor Griggs of the Portland Mercury, Portland Sunday Parkways is "explicitly modeled after Bogotá’s Ciclovía, and the program has since grown into a beloved annual celebration".

The dates and locations vary. A six-mile route in northeast Portland was added in August 2017. There was a five-year hiatus. The September 2024 event celebrated World Car-Free Day. An additional event was added in 2025. There was an East Portland route in July 2025. PBOT estimated that approximately 20,000 people participated in an event in September 2025.

The first event in 2026 had a two-mile route in southwest Portland, including Gabriel Park, Multnomah Arts Center, Multnomah Village, Spring Garden Park, and Village Park. Another event in June 2026 had a four-mile route in Centennial neighborhood, from Ventura Park to Verdell Burdine Rutherford Park. A new event in August started at McCoy Park and had a 6.7 mile route through the St. Johns, University Park, Cathedral Park, and Portsmouth neighborhoods. The 2.3-mile route planned for September 2026 starts at the Cart Blocks and passes downtown sites such as Darcelle XV Plaza, Director Park, Pioneer Courthouse Square, and Portland State University.

== See also ==
- Culture of Portland, Oregon
- Transportation in Portland, Oregon
