= Cranksgiving =

Annual charity bicycle race

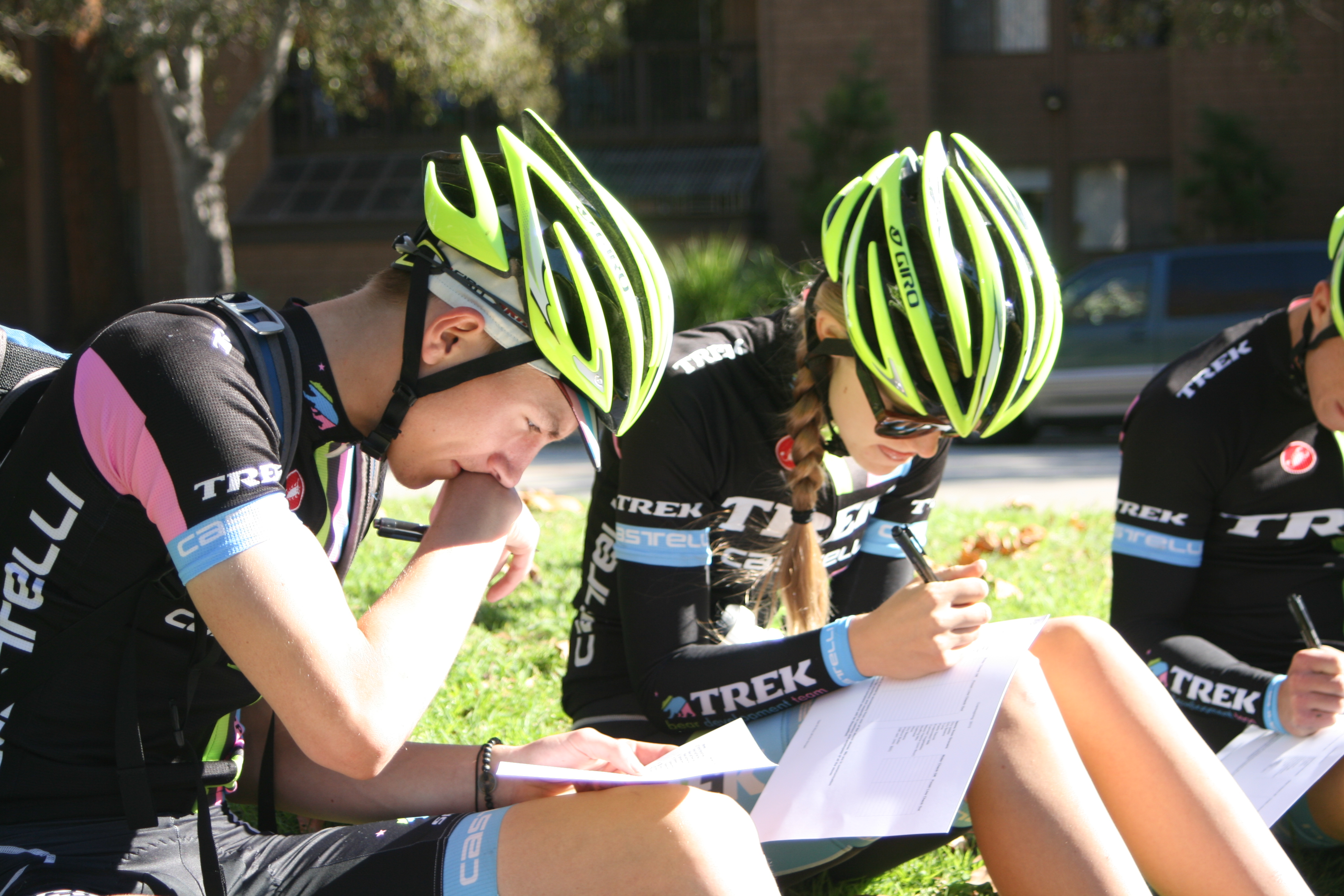
- Two cyclists plan their routes before the 2013 event in Santa Cruz, California

Race details
- Discipline: Alleycat
- Type: Charity
- Web site: cranksgiving.org

History
- First edition: 1999

Cranksgiving is an annual charity event where cyclists compete in an alleycat style race while purchasing food items at stops along the way. The event is scheduled near the American Thanksgiving holiday and the food is donated to local food pantries. The event was started in New York City in 1999 and has since spread to other cities in the United States as well as in other countries.

== History ==
The first Cranksgiving event was November 20, 1999. New York City bicycle messenger Antonio Rodrigues came up with the idea of using an alleycat race as a charity event. A traditional alleycat is an unsanctioned race in which bicycle messengers compete against each other. In contrast, Cranksgiving has been described as "part bike ride, part food drive, part scavenger hunt".

By 2009, the event drew 118 participants in New York, with similar events happening in over a dozen other cities. That year, the New York event collected over $1000 worth of food which was donated to local food pantries. In 2015, New York had 300 participants who collected 3,000 pounds (1,400 kg) of food, including a dozen turkeys and 600 jars of baby food.

In 2019, there were 112 events held in 42 states as well as in the United Kingdom and Canada. Over 20,000 pounds (9,100 kg) of food was collected in Kansas City. In New York City, there were three distinct events held; Brooklyn, Manhattan, and the Bronx, with Citibike making free bikes available for the event. The Seattle event that year collected 2,223 pounds (1,008 kg) of food, while a separate event in West Seattle collected another 1,195 pounds (542 kg).

A 2020 event in State College, Pennsylvania, drew 89 participants who collected over 1,400 pounds (640 kg) of food worth nearly $2500.

== Event format ==
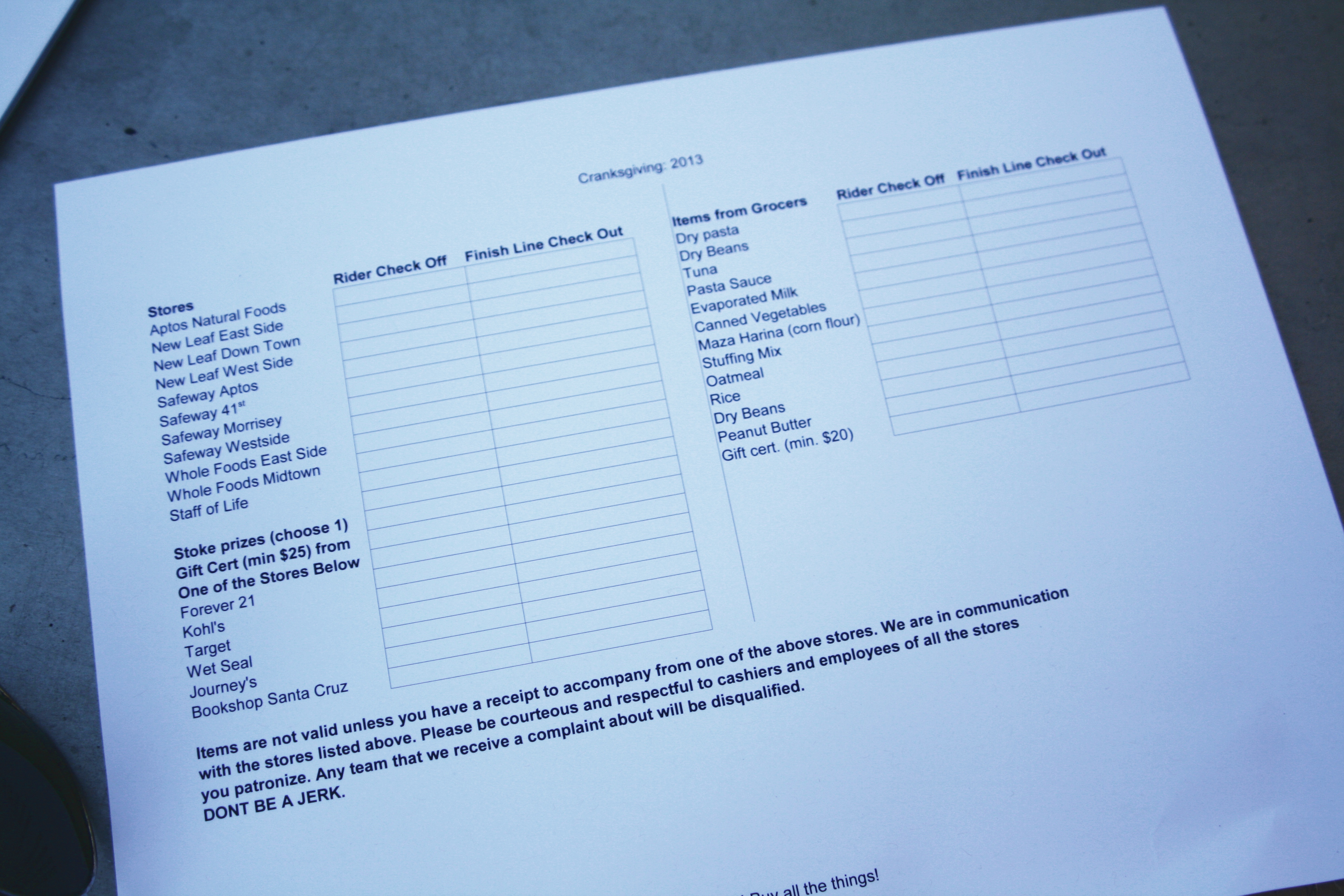
Cranksgiving shopping list

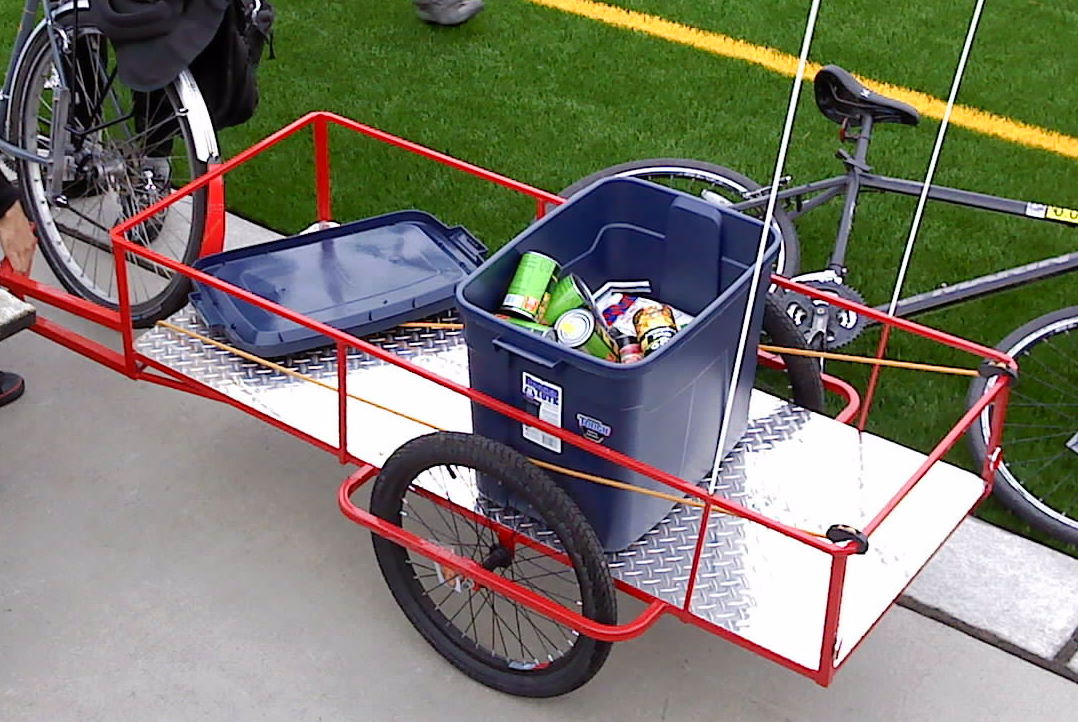
Cargo trailer loaded with Cranksgiving food

Event sponsors are provided a basic set of requirements they must use, but there is no strict format. In general, cyclists are given a list of grocery stores they must visit, with specific routes to be determined by the riders. Riders are also given a shopping list from which they make purchases at each of the stores, and the goods donated to a local charity at the end of the event. While there is no entry fee, riders spend $15 to $20 to complete their purchases.
