= Community Cycling Center =

Bicycle repair shop and education center in Portland, Oregon, U.S.

Coordinates: 45°33′32″N 122°38′51″W

Logo

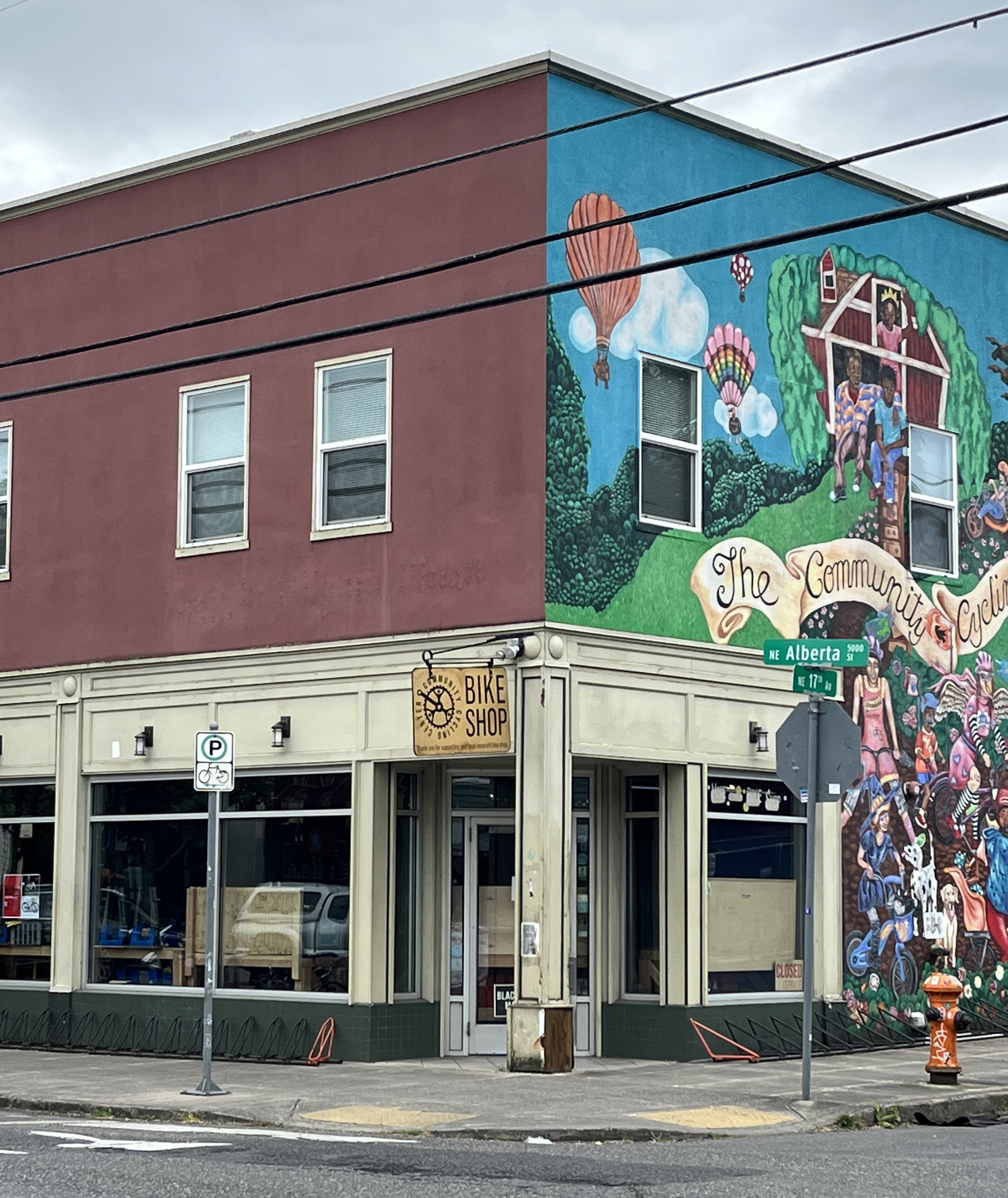
The center's exterior, 2025

The Community Cycling Center is a non-profit community bicycle repair shop and education center in the Alberta Arts District of Northeast Portland, Oregon. It has a Create a Commuter program and refurbishes bicycles for disadvantaged children.

== History and activities ==
Community Cycling Center (CCC) was started by a Brian Lacy, who had previously worked at Citybikes Workers Cooperative, in 1994. The CCC gained national recognition in the 1990s for its Yellow Bikes program, which dispersed refurbished bikes, which had been painted yellow to help distinguish them from privately owned bicycle, throughout the city so that anybody who found one could use it for a time, leave it wherever they wanted, and then it would be used by another rider who would do the same. This program is a precursor to modern app-based bikeshare programs found in many cities throughout the United States

In 2002, the CCC recycled over 30,000 pounds of material and re-used an additional 70,000 pounds.

In 2024, the CCC celebrated its 30 anniversary. Shortly afterwards, it announced it was at risk of closure and launched a major fundraising campaign, which successfully raised $450,000 in 4 months, securing funding for the organization through 2025, as reported by BikePortland.

== Reception ==
CCC won in the Best Bike Shop category of Willamette Week's annual 'Best of Portland' readers' poll in 2025.
