= Rad Life Mobility =

Electric bike company based in Seattle, Washington

- Type: Private
- Industry: Electric bicycles
- Founded: 2007
- Founder: Mike Radenbaugh
- Headquarters: Seattle, Washington, United States
- Key people: Phil Molyneux (CEO); Mike Radenbaugh (Chair)
- Products: Electric bicycles, accessories and related components
- Number of employees: 215
- Website: radpowerbikes.com

Rad Life Mobility (formerly Rad Power Bikes) is an American electric bicycle brand based in Seattle, Washington. Rad Power bikes are primarily sold in North America.

== History ==
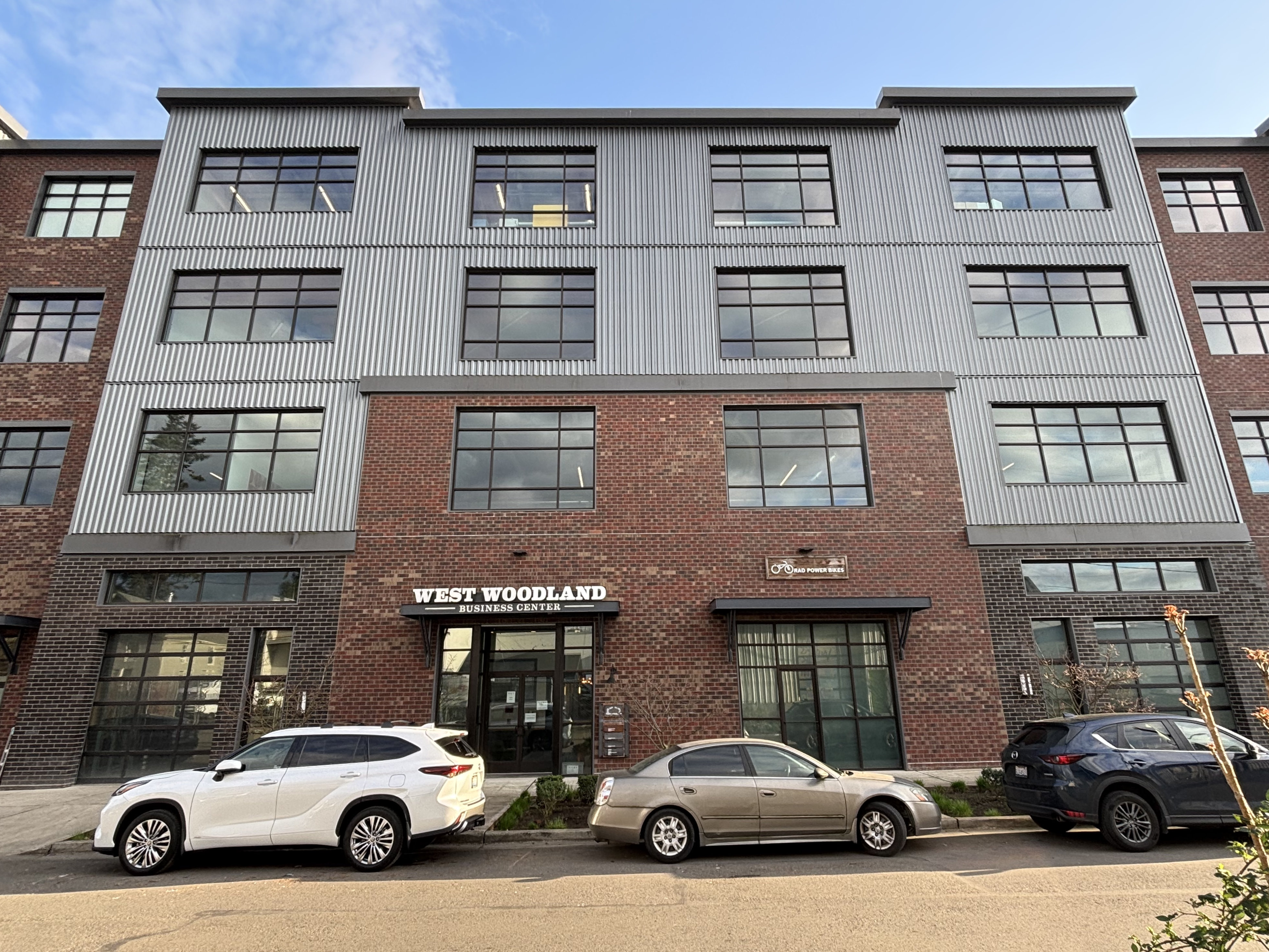
The company's headquarters in the Ballard neighborhood of Seattle, Washington

Rad Power Bikes was founded by Mike Radenbaugh in 2007. The company's business model is direct to consumer and it designs its products at its Seattle headquarters. Radenbaugh remained CEO until 2022 when he was replaced by Phil Molyneux.

Rad Power Bikes opened an office in the Netherlands in 2017. After economic challenges and four rounds of layoffs it left the European market in 2023 to focus on sales in North America.

In 2022 Jonathan and Kaye Steinsapir filed a wrongful death lawsuit against Rad Power Bikes after their daughter died while riding a RadRunner which was settled for a sum of $1.5 million. As part of a separate safety concern in the same year, Rad Power Bikes recalled RadWagon 4 model bikes due to an issue with some of the tires that could cause them to pop and for the rider to lose control of the bike.

Starting in September 2023, Rad Power Bikes announced that all of its e-bikes and lithium-ion batteries would meet UL certification. This was concurrent with a New York City requirement that all e-bikes sold be certified.

Rad Power Bikes has raised a total of $329 million in investments. It is the largest ebike brand in North America with more than 350,000 sales.

=== Battery issues and potential closure ===
After a post-pandemic decline in e-bicycle sales and demand, Rad Power announced to its employees in November 2025 that it faced "significant financial challenges" and would need to scale back operations. The company also filed a WARN notification with the Washington State Employment Security Department on November 10 that would involve a full shutdown of operations and termination of all 64 jobs at the Seattle headquarters by January 2026 at the earliest. Rad Power also cited the increased tariffs and "macroeconomic landscape" as factors in its financial situation.

On November 24, the U.S. Consumer Product Safety Commission (CPSC) issued a product safety warning for Rad Power Bikes that used two models of electric batteries. The agency had found that at least 31 battery fires had been linked to the two models, which were found to have a risk of "spontaneously igniting and exploding", especially when the battery was exposed to water or debris. Rad Power did not issue a recall and challenged the findings from the CPSC.

On December 15, 2025, after admitting that it could not afford any cash to issue a recall against the batteries, Rad Power Bikes filed for Chapter 11 bankruptcy protection. The company is seeking to explore strategic options, including a possible sale of its assets. The company listed assets of $32 million and liabilities of $72 million.

Due to the bankruptcy process, Rad Power Bikes initially stated it will not honor warranties for products purchased prior to December 15, 2025, but will honor warranty requests for products purchased after December 15, 2025. Rad Life Mobility later stated after completion of bankruptcy proceedings that it would honor certain warranties from before December 15, 2026.

On January 20, 2026, the company's retail warehouse in Huntington Beach caught fire, destroying the building. Rad Power Bikes stated that there were no people inside the building and that it was closed for the night. The fire also impacted a community building that hosted several businesses nearby.

=== Acquisition ===
On January 22, 2026, an auction involving five other entities for the sale of Rad Power Bikes concluded with Life Electric Vehicles Holdings Inc, doing business as "Life EV Group", as the winner with a bid of $13.3 million. The sale includes all of Rad Power Bikes' equipment, inventory, intellectual property rights, and financial assets. Assumed liabilities include warranty claims, many of which were not honored due to the bankruptcy process. The second-highest bidder, Retrospec, would be able to take over the acquisition if Life EV Group did not finalize the terms.

Life EV Group was formed with the intention of using "roll-up" acquisitions to consolidate existing e-bike and other light electric vehicle companies. Their acquisition of Rad Power Bikes was completed on March 5, 2026, and the company was renamed to Rad Life Mobility. Offers to re-hire laid off employees were extended to 95% of employees laid off during the bankruptcy proceedings. Life EV also announced plans for a program to replace batteries affected by the CPSC's battery recall at a discounted rate, open stores in 24 American cities, and reduce reliance on third-party logistics.

== Models ==
Rad Power has made several model families of bikes, including the following:

- RadCity
- RadExpand
- RadKick
- RadRover
- RadRunner
- Radster
- RadWagon
- RadMission

== Recognitions ==
In 2021, Rad Power Bikes was included in the inaugural list of the TIME100 Most Influential Companies.

Recognized by Fast Company and Inc. magazines as one of the most innovative and influential companies in 2021.

== See also ==
Cycling in Seattle
