= Portland Bureau of Transportation =

Portland Bureau of Transportation (PBOT)

Agency overview
- Jurisdiction: Portland, Oregon
- Headquarters: Portland, Oregon
- Employees: over 900 (2023)
- Annual budget: $509 million (2023)
- Agency executive: Millicent Williams, Director
- Website: Official

The Portland Bureau of Transportation (or PBOT) is the largest bureau at City of Portland, tasked with maintaining the city of Portland's transportation infrastructure. Bureau staff plan, build, manage, and maintain a transportation system with the goal of providing people and businesses access and mobility. The Bureau received significant media coverage in 2017 for employee hazing within its maintenance operations, as well as a bribery scheme between its parking manager and Cale America that span from 2002 to 2011 for which the manager Ellis McCoy was sentenced to two years in federal prison.

== Organization ==
Previously, the mayor assigned a city commissioner to be in charge of each Portland bureau, who would then appoint a director. However, a charter reform voted into place in 2022 and enacted in 2025 stipulates that bureaus would be moved out of the portfolios of city commissioners. The last city council member to oversee this bureau was commissioner Mingus Mapps in 2024, who hired current bureau director Millicent Williams in July 2023. The bureau is now under the umbrella service area Public Works.

=== History ===
In June 2013, Mayor Charlie Hales appointed Steve Novick commissioner in charge. Novick appointed Leah Treat director in July 2013 following a nationwide search. She replaced interim director Toby Widmer, who had been appointed following the resignation of former director Tom Miller. Interim director Chris Warner replaced Leah Treat in July 2018 after Treat's resignation.

According to the 2014-2015 budget, the Bureau is led by the Office of the Director, which directly oversees communication and six division managers as follows:

- Development Services and Streetcar
- Planning and Capital Services
- System Management (Parking Enforcement, Parking Operations, Parking Garages, Active Transportation, Traffic District Operations, Traffic Design and Regulatory Operations)
- Business Services (Finance and Accounting, Asset Management, Business Technology, Employee Services, Administrative Services)
- Engineering and Technical Services (Civil Design, Bridges and Structures, Survey, Construction Inspection and Pavement, and Signals and Street Lights)
- Maintenance Operations (Construction and Operations, Environmental System and Street Systems)

The City Auditor ombudsman's office which takes in complaints from the general public concerning city bureaus reported in its 2018 annual report that they routinely receive the most complaints about PBOT. They concluded that "several of our complaint investigations found structural unfairness within transportation programs, requiring reform." Sidewalk and vehicle towing concerns represented the greatest number of complaints made with the ombudsman's office about PBOT in 2001. In 2023, PBOT was also the top complaint filed with the ombudsman's office, accounting for 28% of all complaints filed with ombudsman's office. PBOT maintained #1 spot in the share of complaints received by the Ombudsman Office in 2025, representing 24% of all complaints received.

=== Maintenance operations ===
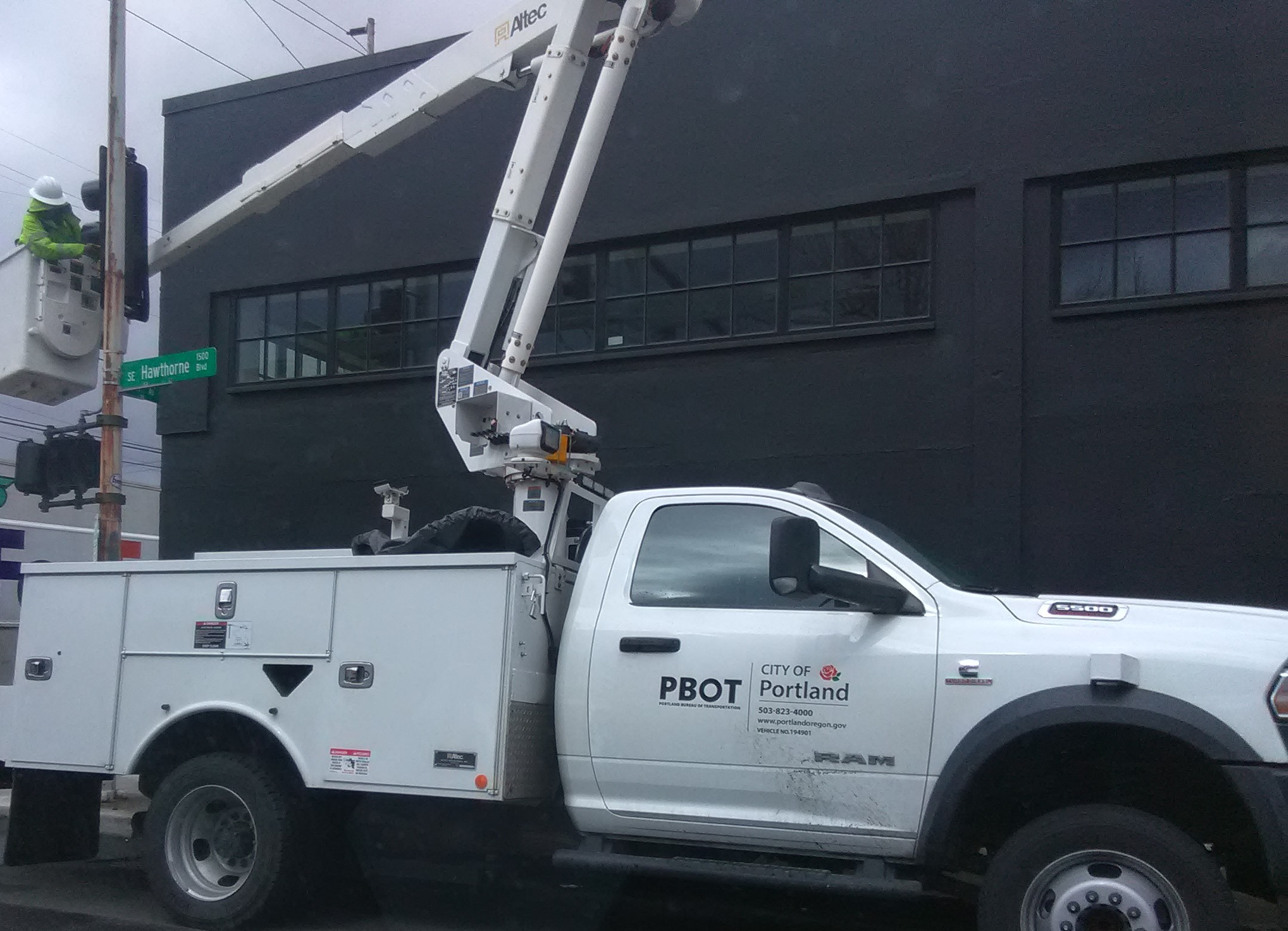
PBOT bucket truck at SE 11th and SE Hawthorne Blvd

==== 2016 hazing incident ====
In May 2017, Willamette Week first reported PBOT's maintenance leader had subjected subordinates to various forms of hazing, such as shooting BBs and popcorn kernels at them. The report obtained by the paper which was based on interviews with nine employees characterized the workplace culture at PBOT maintenance shop as a place of "violence, hazing and bigotry inside a shop that prizes loyalty and punishes "snitching." The investigation was focused around a longtime city employee Jerry Munson who was the crew leader for the "liner crew" maintenance branch. After learning of hazing, city officials transferred the "ring leader" and terminated one of the whistleblowers. An internal investigation of the agency later yielded a pattern of "workplace harassment, intimidation, discrimination, dishonesty, retaliation on the basis of sexual orientation and physical violence". One victim, Adam Rawlins, said that between Augusts 2016 and December 2016, he had been subject to numerous pranks by other employees while he was working at PBOT. His lawsuit, which sought $250,000, indicated that pranks included "being locked in a dark shed while being bound with duct tape and zip ties." The city settled with Rawlins for $80,000 citing "risk the city may be found liable."

=== Parking Enforcement Division ===
The parking enforcement division under PBOT enforces city's parking regulations per title 16 chapter 16.10 of city code. A consultant report obtained by The Oregonian reported Parking Enforcement Division's method is "unprofessional and leaves room for “favoritism” and “illegal conduct"

A 2002 study in Seattle reported Portland had a total of 30 parking enforcement officers which amounted to one for every 237 parking spaces. The average of six cities in the study had one officer for every 93 spaces.

==== 2014 abandoned auto scrapping scandal ====
A PBOT Parking Enforcement Division parking enforcement officer Barbara Lorraine Peterson, a special police officer was convicted of official misconduct in May 2014 for her role in tipping off and accepting kickback for each vehicle tagged as abandoned to illegal tow truck operators whom in turn took them to a crushing yard. This followed an investigation into auto theft. It was found that more than three dozen vehicle owners were victims of illegal scrapping operation in which Peterson had a role. Under standard procedures, vehicles identified as abandoned are tagged, and the owners are given 72 hours to take care of it. Instead, a PBOT parking enforcement officer was tipping off rogue tow truck drivers soon after they were tagged and they took them to a crushing yard before 72 hours had elapsed. The officer in question received a kickback from the tow truck operators for each vehicle she tipped off.

==== 2019 motorcyclist death ====
Under state law, parking within 20 feet of an intersection is prohibited. Local governments are given discretion on its enforcement and PBOT has not been enforcing it in Portland. The City of Portland faces a lawsuit says PBOT's non-enforcement of parking within 20 feet of an intersection contributed to a motorcyclist's death. The city identified some 350 intersections to remove parking spaces from at the request of transportation commissioner at the time Jo Ann Hardesty.

=== Planning and Capital Services ===
The Oregonian reports PBOT's then director Leah Treat signed off on hiring Millicent Williams, a candidate with felony conviction for her role in diverting funds from a non-profit she was leading. She started with a salary of $112,000 in January, 2017 and remained in this position until 2020, then served as the deputy director until May 2021. Williams pleaded guilty for "diverting $100,000 intended for youth programs to pay for a 2009 inaugural ball." Williams returned to PBOT as the bureau director in July 2023.

=== Mobile parking payment ===
In May 2017, PBOT announced that they were launching mobile payment service Parking Kitty, which would allow drivers to pay for parking through a mobile app.

=== System Management ===
==== Cale parking meter scandal ====
Former PBOT parking manager Ellis McCoy was sentenced to serve two years in federal prison for accepting bribery worth $200,000 between 2002 and 2011 from city vendor Cale Meter. McCoy admitted to giving the city contractor Cale America a favorable treatment in return for bribes paid to him. McCoy served time at Sheridan Federal Prison. The City had an existing contract with Cale to purchase additional meters at $7,650 each; however following the publication of the scandal, then commissioner Steve Novick terminated the contract with Cale in August 2013 and opened a competitive bid process. Although Cale got the contract again, the competitive bid process brought it down to $4,995 a piece. The city estimated the competitive bid will save the city several million dollars despite Novick having claimed the previous contract pricing was a "good deal".

== Budget ==
=== Historical budget ===
The bureau's total FY 2016-17 Adopted Budget is $376.0 million. Of that amount, the Capital Improvement Plan for FY 2016-17 totals $91.1 million During FY 2014–15, the Bureau employed 749 staff members. The managed assets totaled $8.4 billion in public assets from streets and bridges to traffic signals and street lights at the time Asset Status and Condition Report 2013 was published

The Portland Bureau of Transportation has a roughly $309 million budget for FY 2014–15. The bulk of the money comes from year-to year carryover ($59 million), bonds and notes proceeds ($51 million), gas taxes ($62.7 million), contracts with other city agencies ($30.7 million), fees for permits and other services ($27.1 million) and parking meters ($25.4 million). Remaining sources included parking garages, the city's general fund, parking citations and local parking permits.

The budget is then split into two categories: discretionary and restricted. Nearly two-thirds of the budget falls in the restricted category, meaning the Bureau must follow certain spending guidelines depending on where the money comes from.

The Bureau's FY 2014–15 discretionary budget is $108.3 million in all. It was spent as follows: Operations ($28 million), maintenance ($27.9 million), overhead and administration ($14.5 million) and construction projects (11.3 million). Another $26 million was spent on various bureau programs, contingencies and reserves.

=== Renewable energy funding ===
The City of Portland paid $119,000 per month for SoloPower's default on a loan the City guaranteed under Mayor Sam Adams in 2011. The payments continued until October, 2020. The money is taken out of Portland's Bureau of Transportation. The Bureau of Transportation pays because parking-meter revenue was used as guaranty.

== Statistics and assets ==
The Portland Bureau of Transportation is responsible for:

- 4,842 lane miles of streets
- 2,520 miles of sidewalks
- 922 signalized traffic intersections
- 55,477 street lights (City owns them all, but operates only 11,284 of them.)
- 157 bridges
- 26 miles of roadside barriers
- 1753 parking meters (410 single meters, 1,343 pay stations)
- Six parking garages
- 331 miles of bike lanes

The Bureau also owns the Portland Streetcar and the Portland Aerial Tram, though they are operated by Portland Streetcar Inc. and the Oregon Health & Science University respectively.

== See also ==
- Portland Sunday Parkways
- Street plazas in Portland, Oregon
- Transportation in Portland, Oregon
- TriMet
