= List of African-American Jews =

This is a list of African-American Jews.

Name	Lifespan	Nationality	Occupation
Eric Andre	born 1983	United States	Actor and comedian
Dinah Abrahamson	1954–2013	United States	Author and politician
Koby Altman	born 1982	United States	General manager of the Cleveland Cavaliers
Moses "Shyne" Barrow	born 1978	United States; Belize	Rapper, politician
Darrin Bell	born 1975	United States	Cartoonist
Nissim Black	born 1986	United States; Israel	Rapper and producer
David Blu	born 1980	United States; Israel	Basketball player
Lisa Bonet	born 1967	United States	Actress
Nell Carter	1948–2003	United States	Singer and actress
Danielia Cotton	born 1967	United States	Singer-songwriter and guitarist
Jordan Dangerfield	born 1990	United States	NFL safety for the Pittsburgh Steelers
Sammy Davis, Jr.	1925–1990	United States	Dancer and singer
Lacey Schwartz Delgado	born 1977	United States	Filmmaker and Second Lady of New York
Daveed Diggs	born 1982	United States	Actor, rapper, singer
Jordan Farmar	born 1986	United States	Basketball player
Ada Fisher	1947–2022	United States	Physician and politician
Aaron Freeman	born 1956	United States	Comedian
Capers C. Funnye Jr.	born 1952	United States	Rabbi
Alicia Garza	born 1981	United States	Activist
Lewis Gordon	born 1962	United States	Philosopher
Kat Graham	born 1989	United States	Actress
Ahuvah Gray		United States; Israel	Writer
Reuben Greenberg	1943–2014	United States	Criminologist
Lani Guinier	1950–2022	United States	Lawyer and scholar
Tiffany Haddish	born 1979	United States Eritrea	Actress and comedienne
Ben Harper	born 1967	United States	Musician
Kali Hawk	born 1986	United States	Actress
Carolivia Herron	born 1947	United States	Writer and scholar
Reese Hopkins		United States	Radio talk show host
Ruby Johnson	1936–1999	United States	Soul singer
Kidada Jones	born 1974	United States	Actress
Rashida Jones	born 1976	United States	Actress
Yaphet Kotto	1939–2021	United States	Actor
Lenny Kravitz	born 1964	United States	Musician
Zoe Kravitz	born 1988	United States	Actress, singer, and model
Sandra Lawson	born 1969	United States	Rabbi
Julius Lester	1939–2018	United States	Author
Karen Lewis	1953–2021	United States	American educator and labor leader
Lauren London	born 1984	United States	Actress and fashion model
Elliott Maddox	born 1947	United States	Baseball player
Saoul Mamby	1947–2019	United States	Boxer
Taylor Mays	born 1988	United States	American football player
James McBride	born 1957	United States	Writer and musician
Yavilah McCoy	born 1972	United States	Teacher
Adah Isaacs Menken	1835–1868	United States	Actress and poet
"Magnificent" Montague	born 1928	United States	Disc jockey
Walter Mosley	born 1952	United States	Novelist
Joshua Nelson		United States	Gospel singer
Aulcie Perry	born 1950	United States; Israel	Basketball player
Rain Pryor	born 1969	United States	Actress and comedian
Shais Rishon	born 1982	United States	Rabbi, writer
Joshua Redman	born 1969	United States	Jazz saxophonist
Gloria Reuben	born 1964	Canada; United States	Actress, jazz singer, and pianist
Tracee Ellis Ross	born 1972	United States	Actress and model
Maya Rudolph	born 1972	United States	Actress and comedian
Anthony Russell	born 1980	United States	Singer and musician
Willie "The Lion" Smith	1897–1973	United States	Jazz pianist
Alysa Stanton		United States	Rabbi
Amar'e Stoudemire	born 1982	United States Israel	Basketball player
Khleo Thomas	born 1989	United States	Actor
Andre Tippett	born 1959	United States	American football player
Michael W. Twitty	born 1977	United States	Writer and culinary historian
Alex Tyus	born 1988	United States; Israel	Basketball player
Rebecca Walker	born 1969	United States	Feminist and writer
Justin Warfield	born 1973	United States	Rapper
Robin Washington	born 1956	United States	Journalist and filmmaker
Jamila Wideman	born 1975	United States	Basketball player
Andre Williams	1936–2019	United States	R&B musician
Earl Williams	born 1951	United States; Israel	Basketball player
Jackie Wilson	1934–1984	United States	Singer
Y-Love	born 1978	United States	Hip hop artist
Drew Bundini Brown	1928–1987	United States	Boxing cornerman and actor
Doja Cat	born 1995	United States	Rapper, singer-songwriter, record producer, and actress
Drake	born 1986	Canada; United States	Rapper, singer-songwriter, and actor
Aaron Samuels			Poet, cofounder of Blavity and Afrotech
Naomi Wadler	2006	United States	Student activist against gun violence
Bizu Riki Mullu			Activist
Helen Alefe		United States	Cook
Bulienne Rollins-Rishon		United States	Speaker, facilitator, writer, and founder of HypheNation
Yosef Webb-Cohen			

- Mazi Melesa Pilip, Ethiopian-born American politician
- Cameron Boyce, child actor

== See also ==
- Jews of Color
