= Barista (restaurant) =

Chain of coffee shops in Portland, Oregon, U.S.

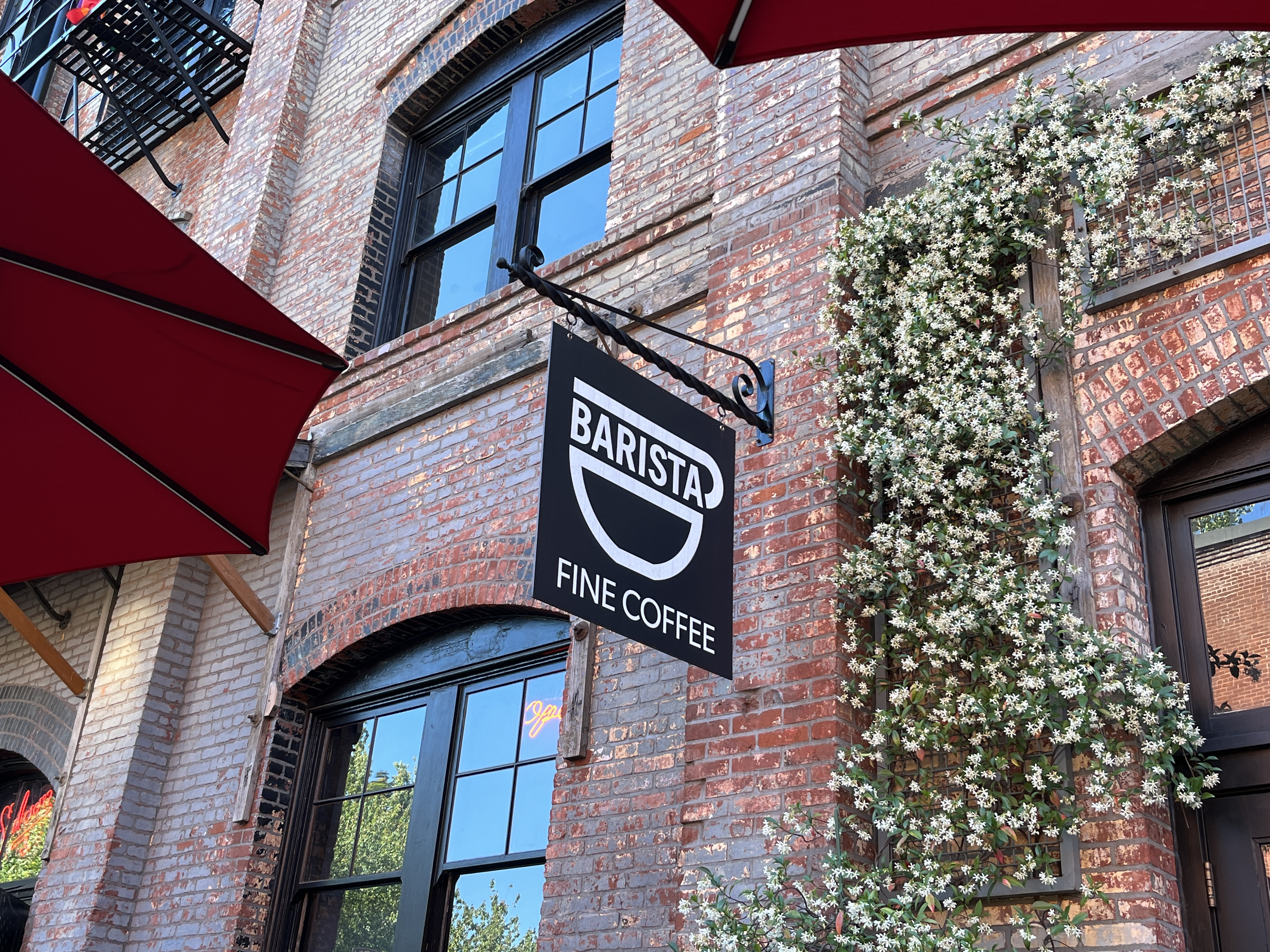
- Exterior of the original location in Northwest Portland's Pearl District in 2023
- Interactive map of Barista

Restaurant information
- Established: 2009
- Owner: Billy Wilson
- Coordinates: 45.5269°N 122.6844°W
- Website: baristapdx.com

Barista is a small chain of coffee shops in Portland, Oregon, in the United States. Owner Billy Wilson opened the original location in Northwest Portland's Pearl District in 2009; subsequent locations opened in Northeast Portland's Vernon neighborhood in 2010, in downtown Portland's Hamilton Building in 2012, and in Northwest Portland's Northwest District in 2013. Barista also operates a fifth shop in Pine Street Market called Brass Bar.

== History and locations ==
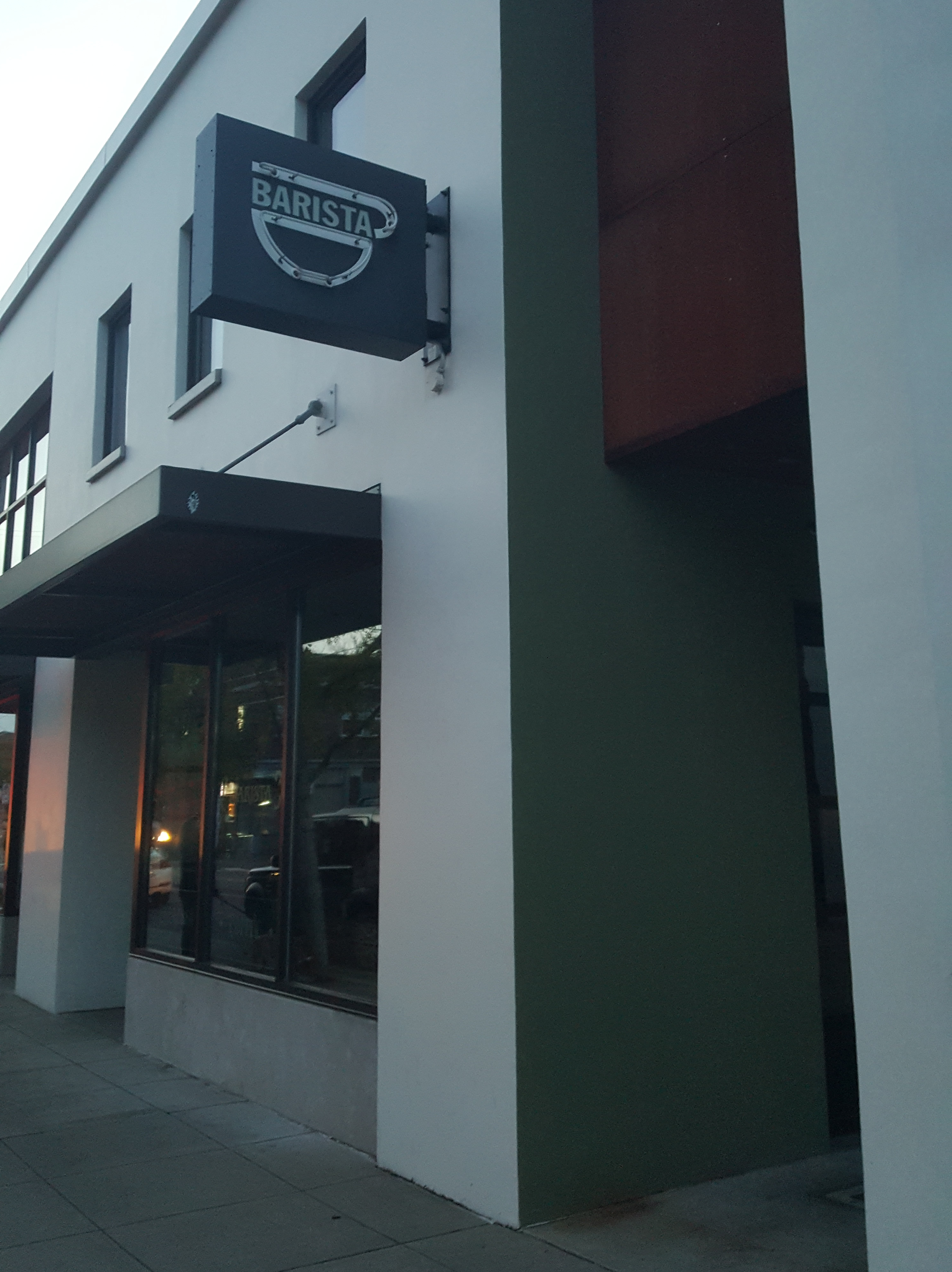
Exterior of the Northeast Portland, Oregon location, 2022

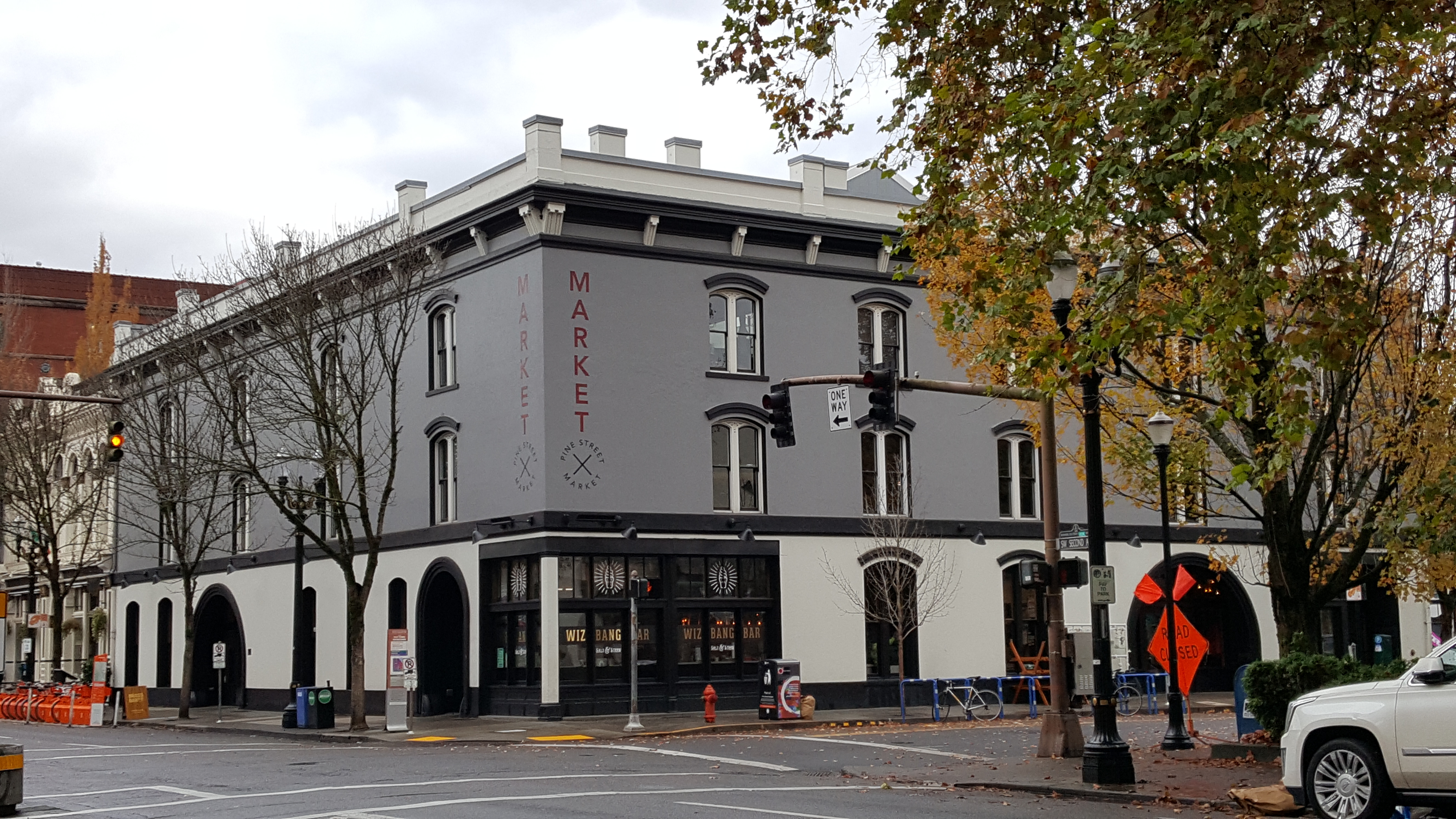
Exterior of Pine Street Market (pictured in 2017) in Old Town Chinatown, which houses the fifth location, Brass Bar

Owner Billy Wilson opened the original location in Northwest Portland's Pearl District in early 2009.

A second location opened on Alberta Street in Northeast Portland's Vernon neighborhood in 2010. The 1,200-square-foot space has a service counter with copper, walnut-stained mahogany furniture and panels, and a La Marzocco Mistral espresso machine. The outpost began serving bottled beers and microbrews in June, and remained the only Barista location to serve alcohol as of 2013. In 2011, Independence Day (July 4) fireworks damaged the building that housed Barista and now-defunct Aviary. Stumptown Coffee Roasters offered a cart so Barista could continue operating. The Barista shop re-opened in November 2011.

In February 2012, Wilson announced plans to open a third location on Third Avenue in downtown Portland's Hamilton Building. The 500-square-foot outpost opened in July 2012. In July 2013, Wilson announced plans to open a fourth location on Northwest 23rd Avenue, in Northwest Portland's Northwest District. For part of August, Barista served only Coava Coffee Roasters to support the brand's retail packaging launch. The fourth location had opened by late 2013. In 2015, Barista announced plans to operate in Pine Street Market, a food hall in the United Carriage and Baggage Transfer Building in the Southwest Portland part of the Old Town Chinatown neighborhood. The fifth location, called Brass Bar, opened in 2016.

=== Menu ===
Barista has served coffee by Coava and Stumptown.

In 2014, Barista shops operated on Christmas, serving a special menu. All locations offered espresso with black walnut bitters, nutmeg, and whipped cream, as well as blonde mochas and hot chocolate with nutmeg and white chocolate by Valrhona. The drinks could be topped with peppermint marshmallows. Having the ability to serve alcohol, the Northeast Portland and Northwest District locations offered: a hot toddy with toddy syrup and sherry; a black velvet with raspberry syrup, Guinness, espresso, and cava; and Guinness with a shot.

== Reception ==
In 2013, Erin DeJesus included the Northeast Portland location of Barista in Eater Portland's list of twelve establishments for getting drunk before noon in the city. Barista also ranked third in The Daily Meal's overview of the nation's best coffee shops, and was included in Grub Street's overview of 58 "extraordinary" coffee shops in the U.S. Hanna Neuschwander included Barista's mocha in The Oregonian's 2013 list of seven "must-try" winter lattes; she said the drink was "for purists -- big on flavor, light on sugar, letting both the chocolate and the coffee shine through". Barista was included in Eater's 2014 "Coffee 38" list of coffee shops and roasters "creating a new narrative in the national coffee scene". The guide noted that Feast Portland co-founder Mike Thelin called Barista a "revolutionary shop". Barista received honorable mention in Willamette Week's annual readers' poll in 2015.

== See also ==
- List of coffeehouse chains
- List of restaurant chains in the United States
