= BLP =

BLP may refer to:

== Organisations ==
- Barbados Labour Party, the governing party of Barbados
- Bougainville Labour Party, in Papua New Guinea
- Beer Lovers Party (disambiguation), name of various political parties
- Berwin Leighton Paisner, an international law firm
- BL Publishing, a division of Games Workshop
- BlackLight Power, a pseudoscientific alternative energy company

== Other ==
- Bell–LaPadula model, in information security
- Bonded Logistics Park, a special economic zone
- Braun's lipoprotein, a membrane protein
- Birrieria La Plaza, a Mexican restaurant in Portland, Oregon, U.S.
- Top R&B/Hip-Hop Albums, a Billboard chart with the shortcut "BLP"
