= Shanghai's Best =

Chinese restaurant in Portland, Oregon, U.S.

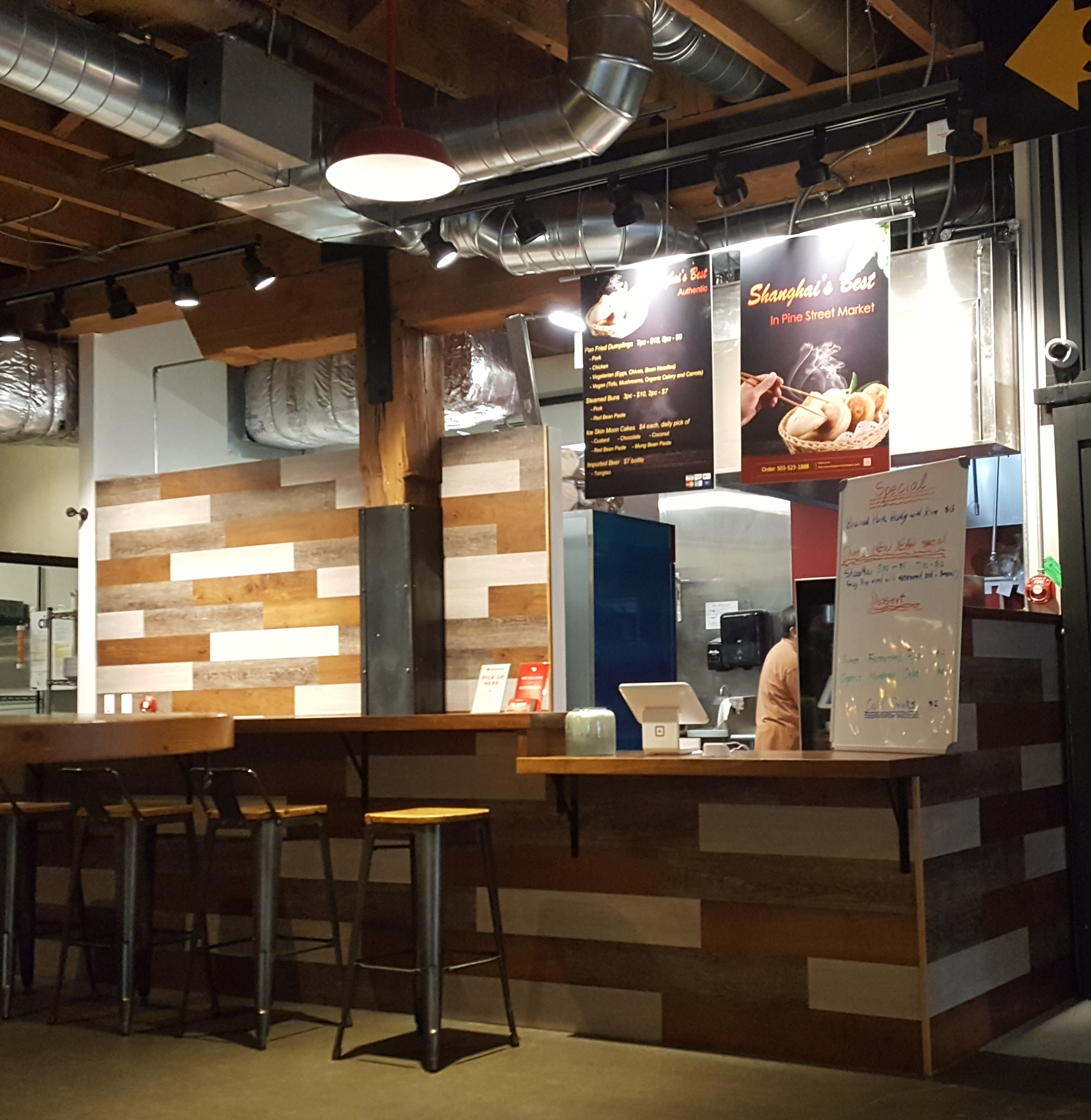
- The restaurant in Pine Street Market, 2022

Restaurant information
- Established: April 2018
- Owner: Lin Chen
- Food type: Chinese
- Location: Portland, Multnomah, Oregon, United States

Shanghai's Best (also known as Shanghai's Best Street Food) is a Chinese restaurant in Portland, Oregon. The business operates from the Pine Street Market, as of 2022, and has previously operated from Portland's Alder Street food cart pod and in Salem.

== Description ==
Shanghai's Best specializes in shengjian mantou, a type of fried baozi (steamed buns). Pan-fried dumplings are made with pork, chicken, vegetarian, or vegan fillings. The vegetarian variety has egg, chives, and mung bean noodles, and the vegan version has tofu, mushrooms, carrot, and celery. The menu also includes steamed buns with barbecued pork or sweet red bean paste, as well as mooncakes.

== History ==
Owner Lin Chen established the business in April 2018. In 2019, the Alder Street food cart pod closed for the development of Block 216 and the Ritz-Carlton, Portland. The Shanghai's Best food cart was initially placed into storage, then relocated to The Yard Food Park in Salem in October 2019. The business began operating from the Cart Blocks in July 2021.

Shanghai's Best operates from the Pine Street Market, as of 2022. The restaurant also participated in The Oregonian's annual Dumpling Week in 2022 and 2026.

== Reception ==
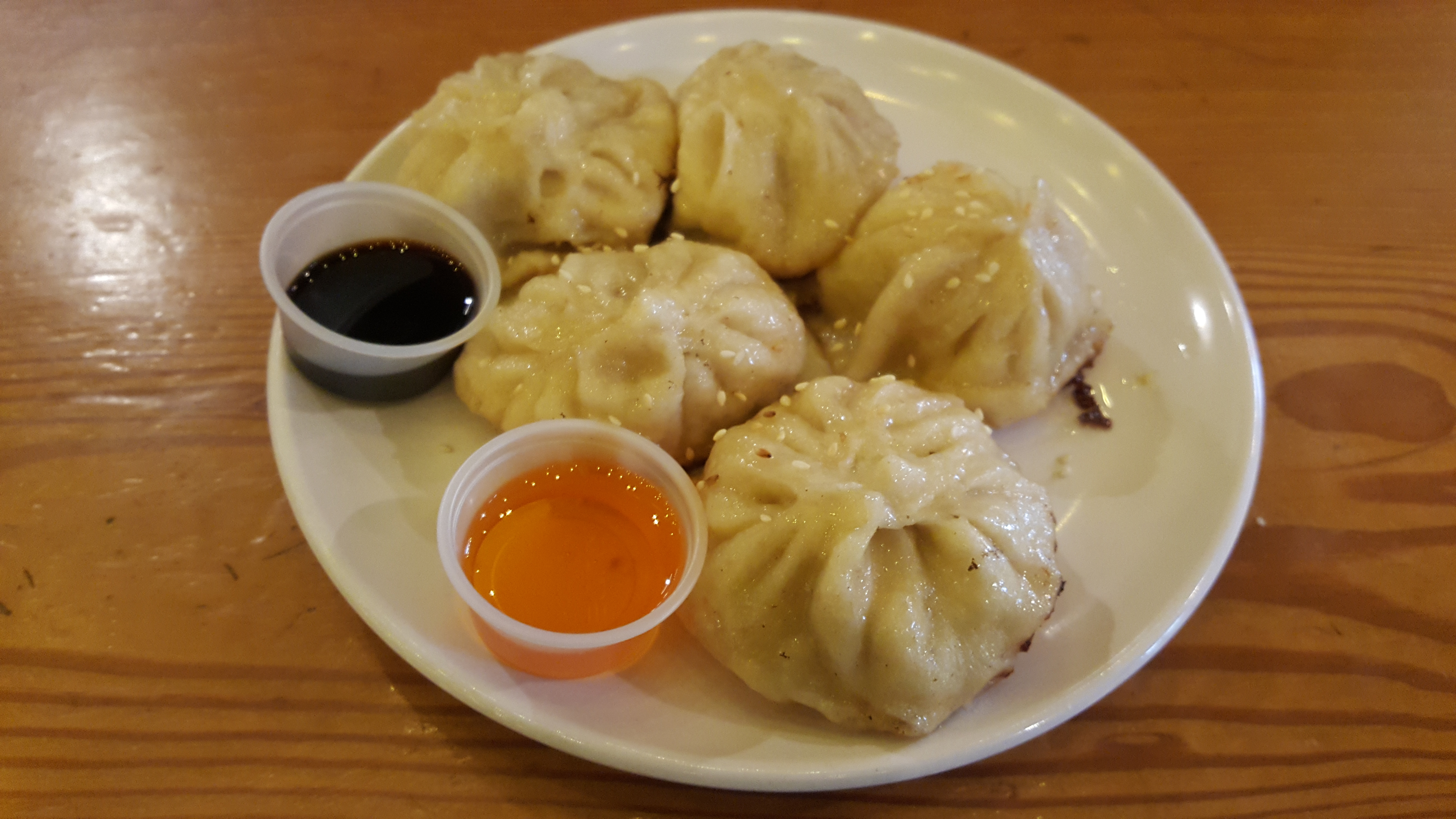
Pork dumplings, 2022

In 2018, Andrea Damewood of the Portland Mercury included Shanghai's Best in her overview of "great new choices for your dumpling fix". She wrote:

The sheng jian bao are the real stars, arriving piping hot and bubbling with juices from the porky filling. Find a place to rest your paper serving tray, which won't withstand the hefty buns without help, and let them rest just a bit before taking your first bite. Your reward will be a thick skin, an oil-crisped bottom, and a savory filling that really oinks when you add some vinegar and soy sauce.

In her 2021 article "Best Thing I Ate This Week: Pan-Fried Pork Dumplings from Shanghai's Best", Portland Monthly's Katherine Chew Hamilton wrote, "The dumplings were a delight—meaty, juicy but not greasy, with crackly bottoms and pillowy tops, and generously sprinkled with sesame seeds." Seiji Nanbu and Brooke Jackson-Glidden included Shanghai's Best in Eater Portland's 2022 overview of "Where to Find Outstanding Chinese Food in Portland and Beyond". The business was also included in Eater Portland's 2022 overview of "Where to Eat and Drink in Downtown Portland".

== See also ==
- History of Chinese Americans in Portland, Oregon
- List of Chinese restaurants
