= Barista Coffee =

Barista Coffee may refer to:

- Barista (company), an Indian café chain.
- Barista Coffee (Taiwan), a Taiwanese café chain.

== See also ==
- Barista
- Barista (restaurant)
