= Bless Your Heart Burgers =

Restaurant chain in the Portland metropolitan area, U.S.

Restaurant information
- Established: 2017
- Owner: Sesame Collective
- Previous owner: Toro Bravo Inc.
- Location: United States

Bless Your Heart Burgers (BYHB) is a small chain of hamburger restaurants in the Portland metropolitan area, in the United States. The business launched in Pine Street Market, a food hall in the southwest Portland part of the Old Town Chinatown neighborhood, in 2017. A subsequent location opened in McMinnville, but only operated for a few months. Owned by the restaurant group Sesame Collective, the business currently operates in northeast Portland's Concordia neighborhood and in Vancouver, Washington. BYHB has garnered a positive reception.

== Description ==
The restaurant chain Bless Your Heart Burgers (BYHB) operates in the Portland metropolitan area. The business has operated in Portland, McMinnville, and Vancouver, Washington. The Vancouver location has an outdoor patio.

The menu has burgers and French fries with beer cheese. The classic single burger has a four-ounce patty, American cheese, brown mustard, ketchup, Duke's Mayonnaise, pickles, shredded lettuce, and sweet onions on a potato roll from Martin's Famous Pastry Shoppe (MFPS). The Carolina burger has chili, onions, and coleslaw. The LL Cool J burger has bacon, guacamole, and ranch dressing. The Bless Your Heart hot dog has Carolina chili and beer cheese. Burger patties are a mix of brisket, chuck, and short ribs. The restaurant also has a smash burger, soft serve, cocktails such as frozen negronis, as well as sodas, beer, and wine. The children's menu includes a grilled cheese. When BYHB operated in a hotel in McMinnville, the restaurant also served breakfast options like granola and pancakes, as well as a fried chicken sandwich and ice cream floats with soft serve.

== History ==
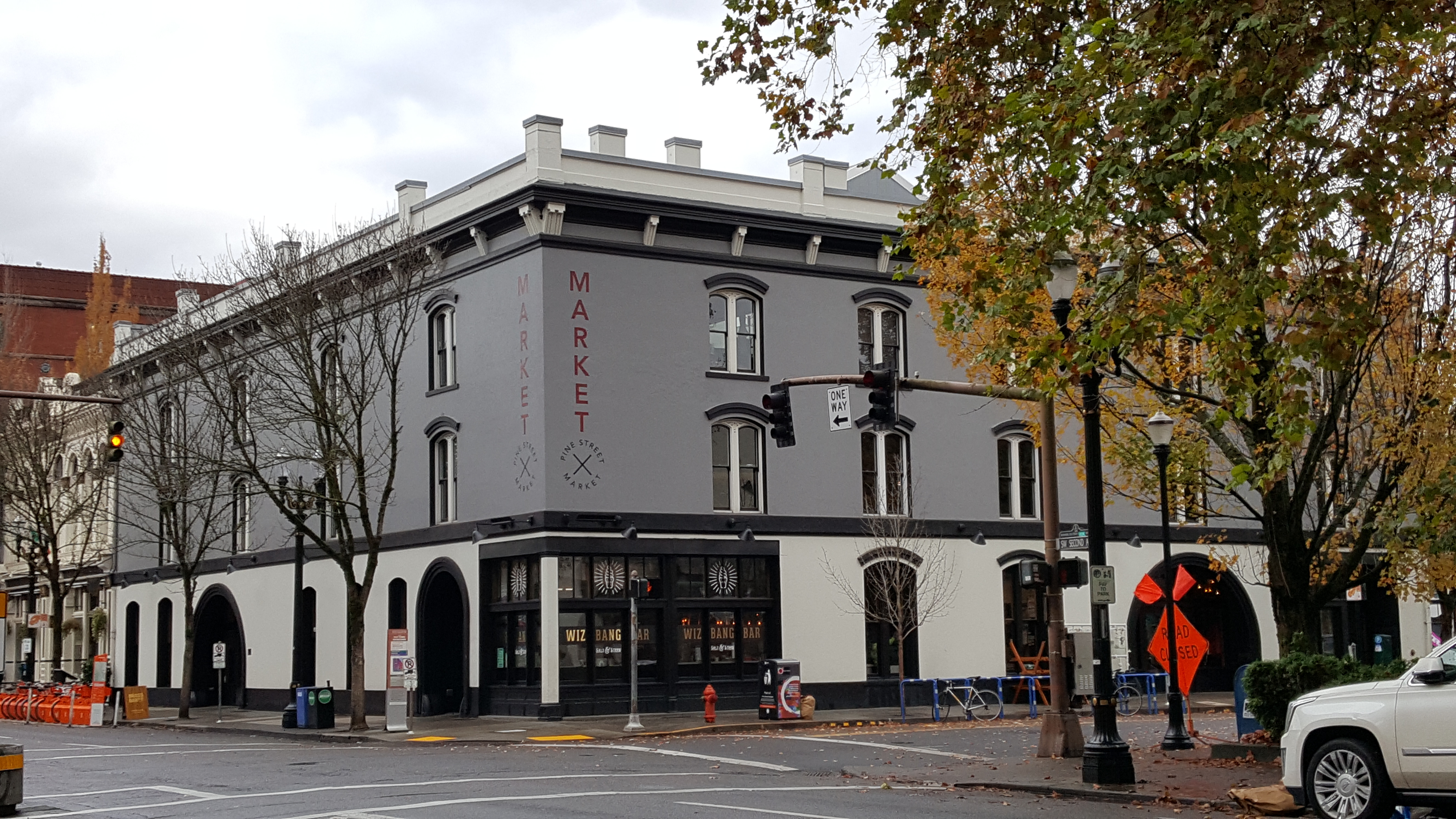
The restaurant launched in Portland's Pine Street Market (exterior pictured in 2017).

BYHB was established by John and Renee Gorham in February 2017. It began operating at Pine Street Market, a food hall in the southwest Portland part of the Old Town Chinatown neighborhood. The business paid homage to John Gorham's and chef Drew Sprouse's home states of North and South Carolina. It marked John Gorham's seventh restaurant, according to The Oregonian. BYHB was the first restaurant in Portland to use the potato rolls from MFPS, which were popularized by the chain Shake Shack.

A subsequent location opened at the hotel Atticus in McMinnville in 2018, but only operated for a few months. It was replaced by Red Hills Kitchen. In northeast Portland, the restaurant operates at Killingsworth Street and 33rd Avenue in the Concordia neighborhood. The Concordia location began operating in July 2019, in the space that previously housed Cannon's Rib Express.

BYHB is owned by the restaurant group Sesame Collective. Previously, the business was owned by Toro Bravo Inc., until 2020. Like many restaurants, BYHB operated via delivery and takeout at times during the COVID-19 pandemic. In 2022, the business announced plans to open a location at The Mill, a shopping center in Vancouver. A grand opening was held on December 16, 2022.

== Reception ==
Andrea Damewood included BYHB in the Portland Mercury's 2017 list of "amazing new places to get seriously good sandwiches". Willamette Week included the business in a 2019 overview of downtown Portland's best "cheap eats". Alex Frane included BYHB in Thrillist's 2019 list of Portland's eleven best burgers. The website subsequently included the business in a 2022 list of fifty "top-notch" American burger restaurants, saying BYHB "serves an exemplary smashburger". Michael Russell ranked BYHB third in The Oregonian's 2021 list of Portland's thirteen best smash burgers. He has also included the business in the newspaper's overview of Portland's forty best inexpensive restaurants in the metropolitan area. Meira Gebel and Emily Harris included the business in Axios Portland's 2023 overivew of the city's best burgers. Ella Dunn included BYHB in KOIN's 2025 list of the ten best burger restaurants, according to Yelp. Nathan Williams included BYHB in Eater Portland's 2024 overview of the city's best hot dogs. The website's Rachel Pinsky included the Vancouver location in 2025 overview the best kid-friendly restaurants in Vancouver.

== See also ==
- List of hamburger restaurants
- List of restaurant chains in the United States
