= Marukin Ramen =

Japan-based chain of ramen restaurants

Restaurant information
- Food type: Japanese

Marukin Ramen is a Tokyo-based chain of ramen restaurants.

In 2021, two Marukin locations in Portland, Oregon, became known as Kinboshi Ramen.

== Description ==
Marukin Ramen is a ramen shop based in Tokyo. There were nine locations in the Greater Tokyo Area, as of 2016.

=== Portland, Oregon ===
Marukin operated two locations in Portland, Oregon, in Old Town Chinatown's Pine Street Market (housed in the United Carriage and Baggage Transfer Building) and in southeast Portland's Buckman neighborhood. Willamette Week's Elise Herron described the Buckman location as "sleek, packing dark-stained family-style tables along the length of the building, which it splits with Thai chicken-and-rice phenom" Nong's Khao Man Gai.

The menu had vegetarian, vegan, and curry options. The vegan Shoyu red ramen has tofu, vegetables, and mushrooms. Marukin also served dumplings, fried chicken and karaage, onigiri rice balls with Japanese pickles, tonkotsu pork broth, beer, sake, and wine. In 2016, Matthew Korfhage of Willamette Week wrote, "Marukin keeps it simple—counter-service ramen with a few sides—and unlike almost every other shop in town, it make its constantly improving, firm-textured noodles by hand at its own shop."

== History ==
Masa Hayashi and Hiroshi Kusuda are co-owners. David Rademacher is a U.S. partner.

In Portland, executive chef Masaji Sakai joined head chef Mayumi Hijikata.

Marukin opened two shops in Portland in 2016. According to the Portland Tribune, the Pine Street location was "sought out to honor Old Town's Japanese heritage". The two shops became known as Kinboshi Ramen in 2021.

== Reception ==
In 2016, Benjamin Tepler of Portland Monthly said "Marukin Ramen is arguably doling out the best ramen in the city, with rotating broths, magnificent noodles, and solid snacks, karaage to onigiri". He said of the Buckman location: "The long, crimson-hued space has attracted lines out the door since softly opening in March. Luckily, Marukin turns out its food with lightening-fast efficiency—under five minutes from iPad swipe to communal table".

Willamette Week's Matthew Korfhage wrote in 2017:

Marukin's tonkotsu is nonetheless in a class by itself in Portland—slightly light for the form, avoiding both indelicate porky sweetness and the gut bomb afflicting lesser tonkotsus, without sacrificing any depth of flavor. The effect is like an elephant riding a unicycle, terrifying and amazing in the bigness of its balance. If you like spicy, get the red version: Marukin has lately dialed in its chili levels to perfection.

Korfhage included restaurant's tonkotsu in Willamette Week's 2018 list of "our favorite noodle bowls and plates in Portland for less than $15" and said, "Every broth served at Marukin is excellent—spicy, miso, shio, whatever... But it's all about that deep, hazy, porky tonkotsu shoyu bone broth... It feels impossible in both its delicacy and its depth, digging deep into the marrow of comfort." In 2017, the newspaper's Martin Cizmar wrote, "Marukin has wowed us since opening since opening its first stateside shop here. When we ate 39 different bowls around the city last year, Marukin came out on top in tonkotsu and made a strong showing elsewhere."

Thrillist has said, "Marukin's simplicity is notable -- the bowl is not overly loaded with meat and veggies, relying on the impeccably seasoned broth and handcrafted noodles to satisfy ramen lovers and convert those poor, sad, lonely ramen skeptics. In short, Portland’s noodle game just got bumped up a notch." The website's Dan Schlegel called Marukin an "essential" restaurant for Buckman in a 2016 list of Portland's 11 "best neighborhoods for eating". Alex Frane included Marukin in the website's 2020 list of the "best spots to slurp ramen" in Portland. Marukin was a runner-up in the People's Choice category at the Whiskey and Ramen Festival in 2017. The Daily Hive included Marukin in a 2021 list of 7 "spots in Portland that serve up slurp-worthy ramen".

== See also ==
- History of Japanese Americans in Portland, Oregon
- List of Japanese restaurants
