= Block 216 =

Building in Portland, Oregon, U.S.

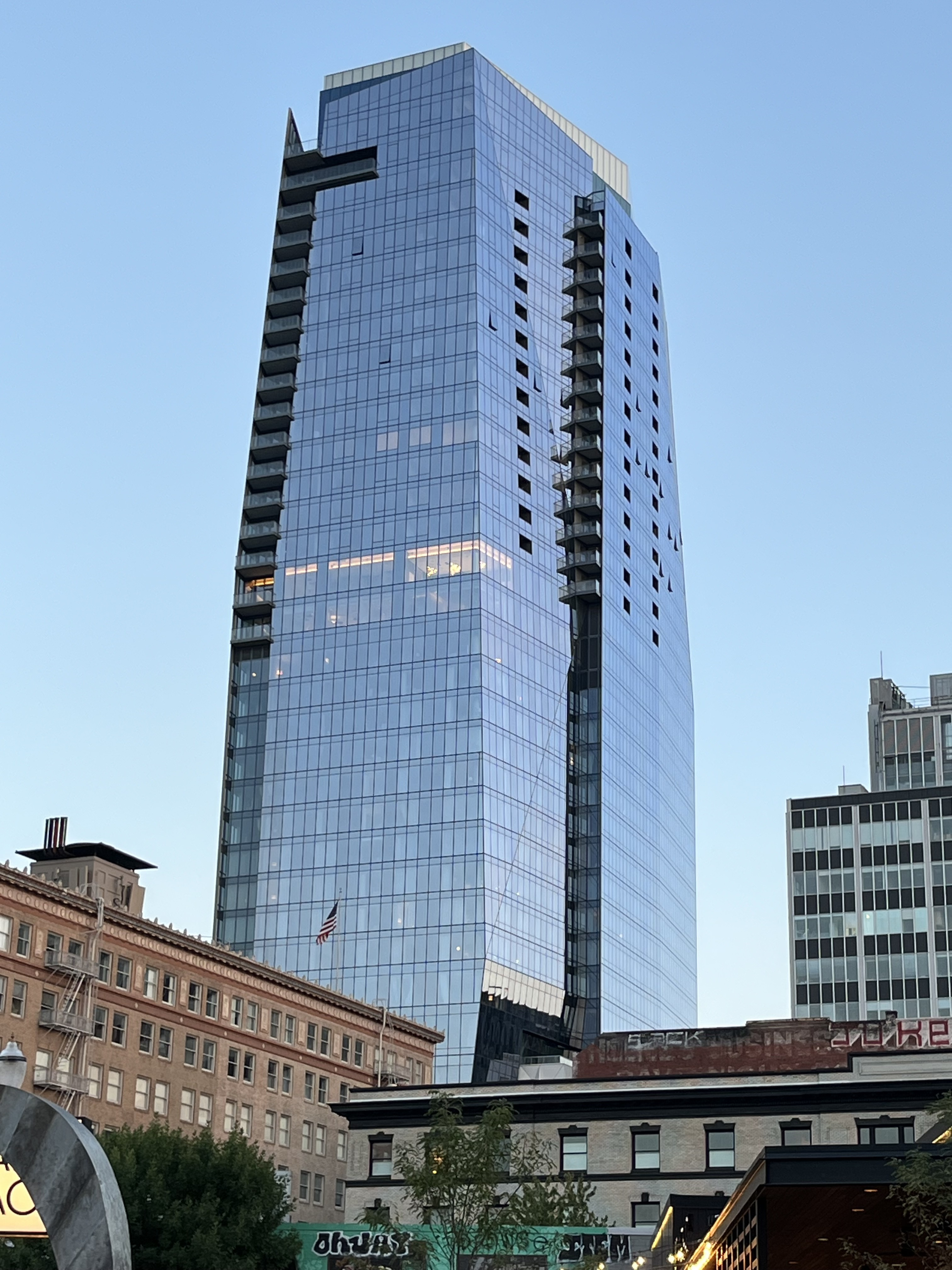
- The building viewed from Burnside Street

General information
- Location: 900 Southwest Washington Street, Portland, Oregon, United States
- Coordinates: 45.52088°N 122.68106°W

Height
- Height: 460 ft (140 m)

Technical details
- Floor count: 35

Design and construction
- Architecture firm: GBD Architects
- Developer: Walter Bowen / BPM Real Estate Group

Other information
- Number of units: 132 condominiums 251 hotel rooms

Block 216 is a high-rise building in downtown Portland, Oregon, United States. The 35-story building replaced the Alder Street food cart pod and parking lot between 9th and 10th avenues and Alder and Washington streets. At 460 feet (140 m) tall, it is Portland's fifth-tallest structure. Block 216 houses the Ritz-Carlton, Portland, the food hall Flock, and other retailers.

== Description and history ==
Block 216 was designed by Portland-based architecture firm, GBD Architects, and structural engineering firm, KPFF, and is the largest building by volume constructed in Portland since the U.S. Bancorp Tower. Walter Bowen / BPM Real Estate Group was the developer.

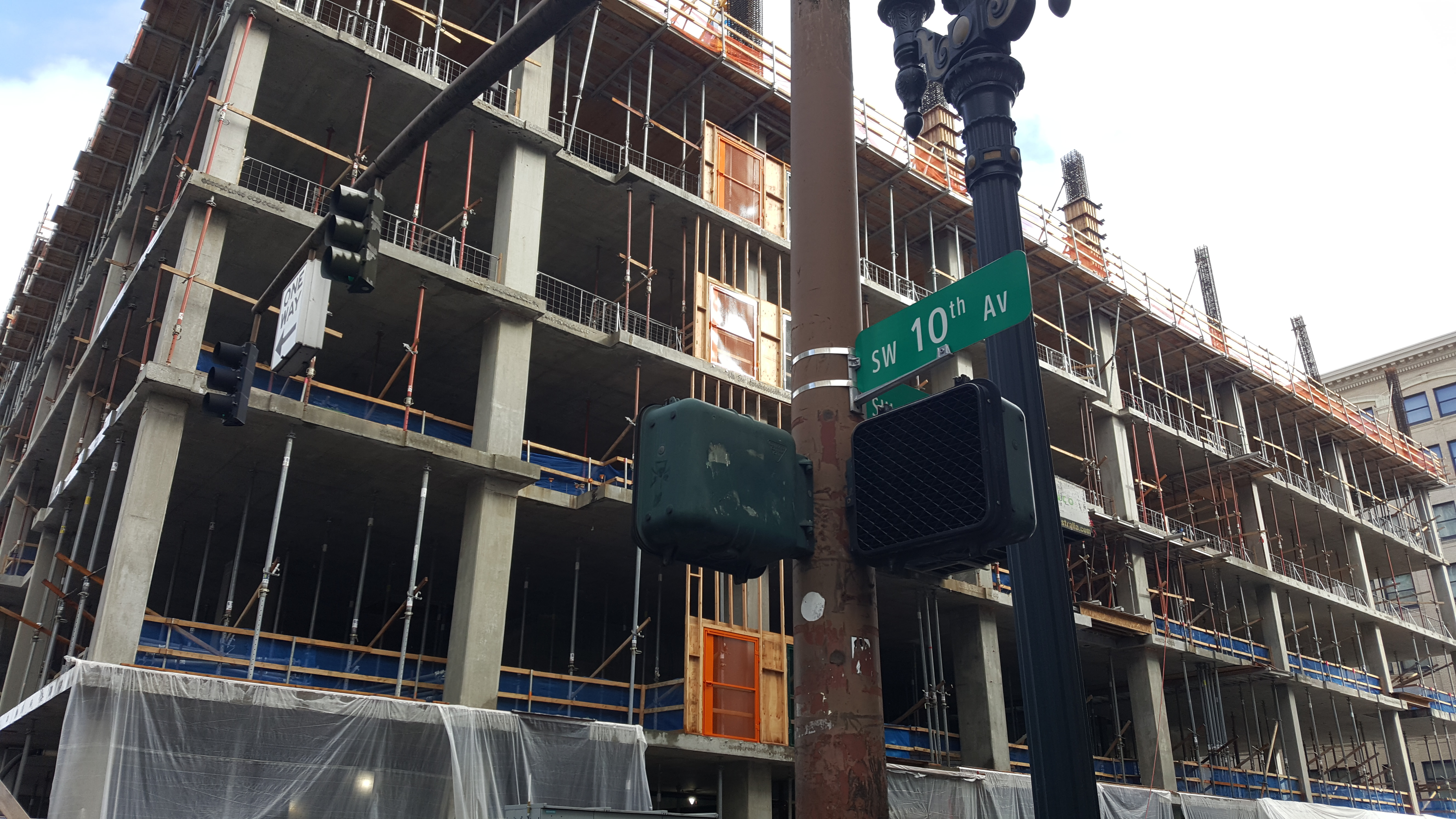
The building under construction in 2021

The Alder Street food cart pod, Portland's largest with dozens of vendors, previously occupied this block before plans for the tower were announced. The cart pod closed in June 2019. The groundbreaking ceremony was held on July 12, 2019. A grand opening was scheduled for August 15, 2023. The development includes one block of the Green Loop, the first portion of the in-progress linear park to be completed downtown, though the project team requested the waiving of the requirement that buildings along the Green Loop are set back 12 feet to accommodate space for trees and other landscaping.

In March 2024, general contractor Howard S. Wright filed a $26 million construction lien against the project. The real estate brokerage Colliers said the completion of completion of the 11W and Block 216 projects "marked the end of downtown Portland's pre-COVID speculative office building construction".

=== Tenants ===
Ritz-Carlton manages a hotel (the first in the Pacific Northwest), as well as condominium units in the building's upper floors. The lowest seven floors comprise 158,000 square feet (14,700 m^{2}) of office space; one major tenant is the law firm Davis Wright Tremaine, who will occupy 19,100 square feet. Packouz Jewelers and Rolex will reportedly occupy retail storefronts.

==== Flock food hall ====
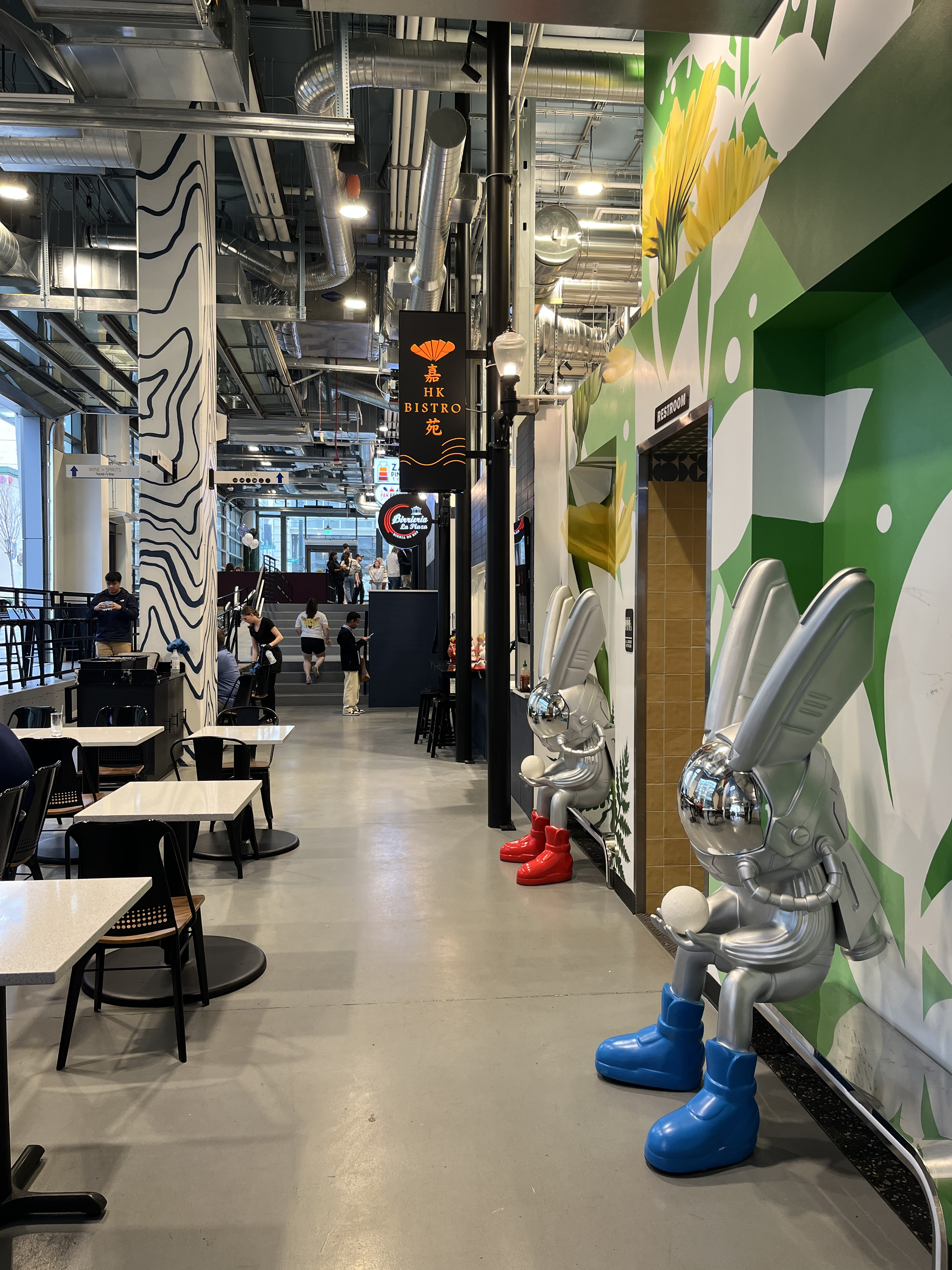
Interior of the Flock food hall, 2025

Flock is Block 216's ground floor food hall with indoor and outdoor seating for approximately 130 people. The space accommodates ten vendors, including one designated for hosting pop-ups. The approximately 8,000-square-foot food hall was designed by Woodblock Architecture.

The company operating Flock received a $3 million loan for the project from Prosper Portland, following approval by the board of commissioners in 2023. Flock was slated to launch with the following nine BIPOC-owned businesses:

- Artly Coffee, which serves coffee and other drinks via robots
- Birrieria La Plaza, an outpost of the Mexican restaurant most known for birria
- Kim Jong Grillin' (Korean cuisine)
- Magna Kusina presents Sun Rice (or Sunrice)
- Prime Tap House, the food hall's main bar
- Queen Mama's Kitchen (Saudi Arabian cuisine)
- Suzaku (sushi)
- ZabPinto Thai Kitchen (Thai cuisine)

Originally scheduled to open in November 2023, Flock experienced a series of delays opening. In March 2024, Eater Portland reported that Kim Jong Grillin' and Sun Rice had pulled out of the project, and no opening date for the food hall has been announced. In April 2024, the website's Brooke Jackson-Glidden reported that Pan Roast planned to open in Flock in May. In July, Axios Portland said an August opening might be possible.

Following a preview event on January 30, Flock opened on February 2, 2025. The opening included a ribbon cutting ceremony and a lion dance to commemorate Lunar New Year. In addition to Birrieria La Plaza, Prime Tap House, Queen Mama's Kitchen, and ZabPinto Thai Kitchen, the food hall opened with the following vendors:

- Bb.q Chicken (Korean fried chicken)
- HK Bistro (Chinese cuisine, dim sum)
- Pan Roast PNW (seafood)
- Tous le Jours, described as a French-Asian bakery

Flock is slated to host events, such as viewing parties for the Super Bowl and a Portland Trail Blazers game in February 2025. The winery Nest and Vine is also a vendor.

Jade Cow Creamery opened in the food hall on July 18, 2026.

== See also ==
- List of restaurants in Portland, Oregon
- List of tallest buildings in Portland, Oregon
