= Reuben Greenberg =

American police chief and criminologist

Reuben Morris Greenberg (June 24, 1943 – September 24, 2014) was the first black police chief of Charleston, South Carolina, and known for being an innovative criminologist.

He was police chief there from 1982 until his retirement in 2005.

== Childhood ==
Born on June 24, 1943, in Houston, Texas, Greenberg was the son of a Russian Jewish immigrant father and an African-American mother. Of Ashkenazi Jewish ancestry on his father's side, he converted to his father's religion of Judaism at the age of 26.

== Education ==
Greenberg received his bachelor's degree in anthropology from San Francisco State University in 1967, and earned master's degrees in public administration and city planning from University of California, Berkeley in 1969 and 1975. He was also a graduate of the FBI Academy.

== Teaching career ==
While he was chief of police in Charleston So. Carolina, he taught one semester of criminology at the Citadel. He taught sociology as an assistant professor at California State University, political science at the University of North Carolina at Chapel Hill, and criminal justice at Florida International University.

== Law enforcement career ==
He served as the undersheriff of the Chatham County Sheriff's Department in Savannah, Georgia, and he was a major with the city's police department. In Florida, he was chief of police at Opa-locka and chief deputy sheriff of Orange County, rising to deputy director of the Florida Department of Law Enforcement. He arrived in Charleston as chief of police in 1982.

In the words of Charleston's The Post and Courier reporter David Slade, he "turned the... Police Department into a national model. In the process, he became a celebrity and a source of pride for the city ...."

Greenberg told his cops that their job was not to punish (that was up to the courts), but to make arrests, and in order to do that they had to be on good terms with the citizens. So he put his cops out on the streets, not in cars. They walked, rode bicycles and horses, and were accessible to "normal people," who might not want to call or visit headquarters.

He also required that every cop earn a bachelor's degree, whereas when he arrived at the department not all had even graduated from high school. He added a K-9 bomb and drug-sniffing unit, a harbor patrol, and a crime lab to the police department. He had a team of officers remove graffiti the moment it appeared, sending a message that the city belonged to the police, not the vandals.

It worked, and Greenberg became a media celebrity. The Los Angeles Times headlined its profile, "Black Police Chief Skates Past Skeptics."

Charleston's population increased 64% during the time Greenberg was chief, while crime decreased 11 percent.

Greenberg retired in 2005 after over 23 years of service. This followed a controversial 2005 incident in which a motorist charged that he hit her car door after she told him that she had called the police department to report his erratic driving. Health reasons, such as high blood pressure, were cited as the cause for his behavior for several years, which included poking a news reporter in the chest while on video in 2003 (he later apologized, saying "I'm not proud ... It was not my finest hour"), calling an anti-war demonstrator a "crazy fat lady" in 2003 (he later said, "I was wrong. She's not fat. She's obese. She's grossly obese. If she doesn't like that, she can do something about it, like the Atkins diet that I was on."), and being involved in five traffic accidents while in his police vehicle over a 6-year period. During one of these accidents, in 2005, he hit a car while turning the wrong way down a one-way street.

== Death ==
Greenberg died on September 24, 2014, in Charleston, South Carolina after a long illness.

== Awards ==
Greenberg was named Justice Professional of the Year in 1991 by the Southern Criminal Justice Foundation, received the Foundation for Improvement of Justice 1989 Achievement Award and the Free Spirit Award from the Freedom Forum in 1994 for distinguished success in fighting crime.

== Author ==
Greenberg was the author of Let's Take Back Our Streets, 1989, written with Arthur Gordon, a consulting editor of Guideposts. In the book he told about moves he made to take back the streets in his adopted city from criminals, and what he thought other law officers could do to accomplish that.

He also authored a number of police-related articles, and has appeared as a guest columnist for several newspapers, most notably the Detroit News He was the subject of an article in Reader's Digest.

== TV ==
Greenberg explained his tactics and strategies on television programs such as 60 Minutes, Larry King Live, The Phil Donahue Show, The Today Show, Both Sides with Jesse Jackson, and The MacNeil/Lehrer Newshour.

== Film ==
Greenberg appeared in Shalom Y'all, a 2002 documentary about Jews in the American South which also featured author and singer Kinky Friedman.
