= Queen Mama's Kitchen =

Saudi Arabian restaurant in Portland, Oregon, U.S.

- Exterior of the brick-and-mortar restaurant on Oak Street in downtown Portland in 2025
- Interactive map of Queen Mama's Kitchen

Restaurant information
- Established: February 2020
- Owner: Maha Alharbi
- Food type: Arab; Mediterranean; Middle Eastern; Saudi Arabian
- Location: 406 Southwest Oak Street, Portland, Multnomah, Oregon, 97204, United States
- Coordinates: 45.5211°N 122.6756°W

Queen Mama's Kitchen is a primarily Saudi Arabian restaurant in Portland, Oregon, United States. It is among the nation's only Saudi Arabian restaurants. Queen Mama's Kitchen also serves other types of Arab cuisine, as well as Mediterranean, and Middle Eastern cuisines. The business was established as a catering company in 2020 and was later operated as a food cart and food truck in the suburbs of Beaverton, Hillsboro, and Tanasbourne. In addition to the brick-and-mortar restaurant on Oak Street in downtown Portland, the business operates at the Flock food hall in Block 216.

== Description ==
Queen Mama's Kitchen is a restaurant and bakery that serves Arab, Mediterranean, and Middle Eastern cuisines on Southwest Oak Street in downtown Portland. Scott Campbell of Arab News has described the dining room as "chic". Brooke Jackson-Glidden of Eater Portland has described the interior as "ornate", with various shades of blue, including cerulean, robin's egg blue, sapphire, sodalite, and sky blue. The banquettes are burnt orange and the table lamps are made of brass. Many mirrors and plates are displayed in the dining room. The business also operates in the Flock food hall in Block 216. Previously, the business catered and operated as a food cart and food truck in various suburbs of Portland.

Campbell has said of the restaurant's clientele: "Customers don't fit any single demographic. On any given day, there can be couples, students, families or even out-of-town visitors who travel from as far as Washington and Seattle (three hours away) to tuck in to the lavish breakfast spreads on Sunday mornings." Campbell also said the restaurant "might contain homesick Gulf students, curious first-time visitors and families who have driven for hours across the Pacific Northwest".

=== Menu ===
Queen Mama's Kitchen serves dinner as well as weekend brunch. The primarily Saudi Arabian menu has included basbousa, koshari, hummus and pita, lamb, margoog, saleeg, rice dishes with saffron, shawarma, and Yemeni mandi. The restaurant's most popular dish is the cracked-wheat jareesh. Dates and Arabic coffee are also on the menu. The coffee is served from traditional dallah pots. Queen Mama's Kitchen imports spices from Saudi Arabia. The restaurant also serves cheesecakes, including almond and pistachio varieties.

== History ==
Maha Alharbi is the restaurant's owner. She started the business as a catering company in early February 2020, gaining momentum, via social media and word-of-mouth, until the arrival of the COVID-19 pandemic. Alharbi began operating the business as a food cart in 2021. She operated Queen Mama's Kitchen in the suburbs of Beaverton, Hillsboro, and Tanasbourne, before opening the brick-and-mortar location on Oak Street in 2022.

Queen Mama's Kitchen is among the city's only Saudi Arabian food options. It hosts a special menu for Ramadan. In 2023, the business was announced as one of the first vendors in the Flock food hall, which opened in February 2025. Flock invited Queen Mama's Kitchen as the only Arab restaurant and the only woman-owned business.

== Reception ==
The restaurant's stall at Block 216's food hall Flock, 2025

Scott Campbell of Arab News has called the restaurant "an introduction to a culture that is often misunderstood around the world". Campbell said online reviewers have praised the business for its authenticity, hospitality, and service. A profile of Alharbi and Queen Mama's Kitchen by Campbell was included in Condé Nast Traveler Middle East's 2026 overview of "chefs taking Middle Eastern food to the world". Campbell said the business was among the nation's most successful Saudi Arabian restaurants, with a loyal following and giving guests "a glimpse of Saudi culture".

For the 2026 FIFA World Cup match between Egypt and Qatar, Zoe Baillargeon of the Portland Mercury recommended Queen Mama's Kitchen for the koshari, which is Egypt's national dish, and the jareesh, which is popular in Qatar. In 2026, Hospitality News Middle East credited Alharbi for "[introducing] authentic Saudi cuisine to a wider audience" and said, "Through traditional recipes and ingredients imported from the Kingdom, she is helping showcase one of the region's lesser-known food traditions." Eater Portland has included Queen Mama's Kitchen in a guide to the city, and in overviews of the city's best restaurants for special occasions as well as downtown's best restaurants.

== See also ==
- List of bakeries
- List of food trucks
- List of Middle Eastern restaurants
