= Ritz-Carlton, Portland =

Hotel in Portland, Oregon, U.S.

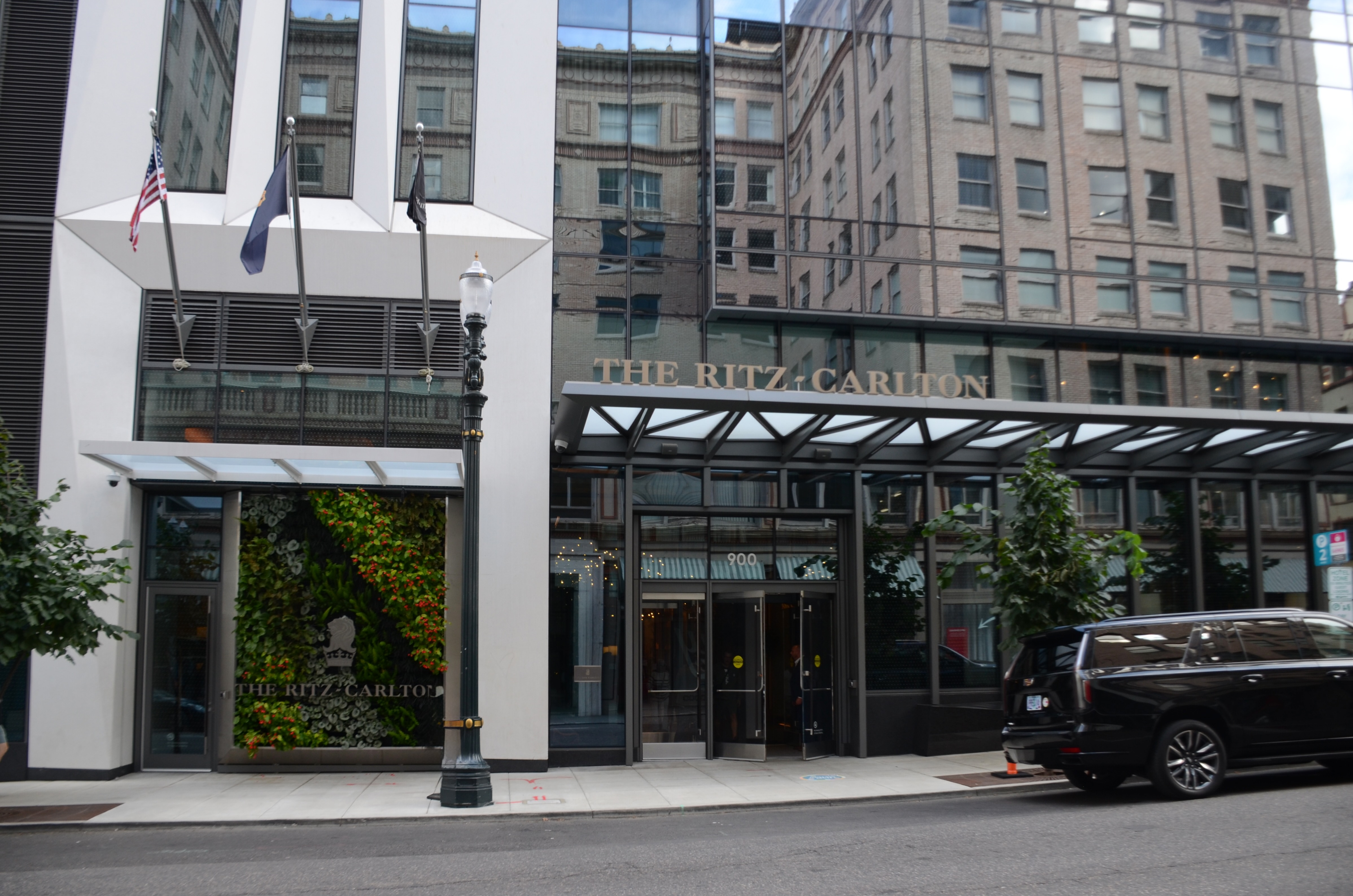
- Entrance, 2025
- Interactive map of the Ritz-Carlton, Portland area

General information
- Location: Portland, Oregon, United States
- Coordinates: 45.52089°N 122.68028°W
- Groundbreaking: July 12, 2019
- Opened: 2023

Technical details
- Floor count: 35

Other information
- Number of rooms: 251

The Ritz-Carlton, Portland is a Ritz-Carlton hotel in Block 216 in Portland, Oregon, United States. The 251-room hotel is Ritz-Carlton's first in the Pacific Northwest. Esquire magazine recognized the Ritz-Carlton as one of the best new hotels.

== Description ==
The hotel's lobby, 2024

The Ritz-Carlton operated hotel occupies one-third of the 35-story Block 216, on floors 8 to 18. The hotel has 251 rooms and access to an amenity floor, lounge, spa, and swimming pool on the 19th floor. The spa's petals design is inspired by the locally symbolic rose. The hotel also offers approximately 17,000 square feet space for events and meetings on a floor called Ascending Mount Hood. The 132 condominiums on the upper 15 floors range from 1,100 to 4,000 square feet (100 to 370 m^{2}), with 22 penthouse units on floors 32 to 35. Condos range in price from $1.1 million to $9 million.

The hotel's plant-filled lobby, intended to replicate the Pacific Northwest's lush landscape, is called Forest Hall. The lobby bar and lounge Meadowrue is named after the Western meadow-rue, a plant native to the region. The bar serves breakfast foods and coffee by Coava Coffee Roasters during the day and cocktails in the evening. The library has Verre églomisé glass.

Joseph Gallivan of the Portland Tribune called the hotel's design "heavy with pioneer touches and Lewis & Clark chic". The hotel's signature room scent, called "Rose City", was designed by Antica Farmacista.

=== Bellpine ===
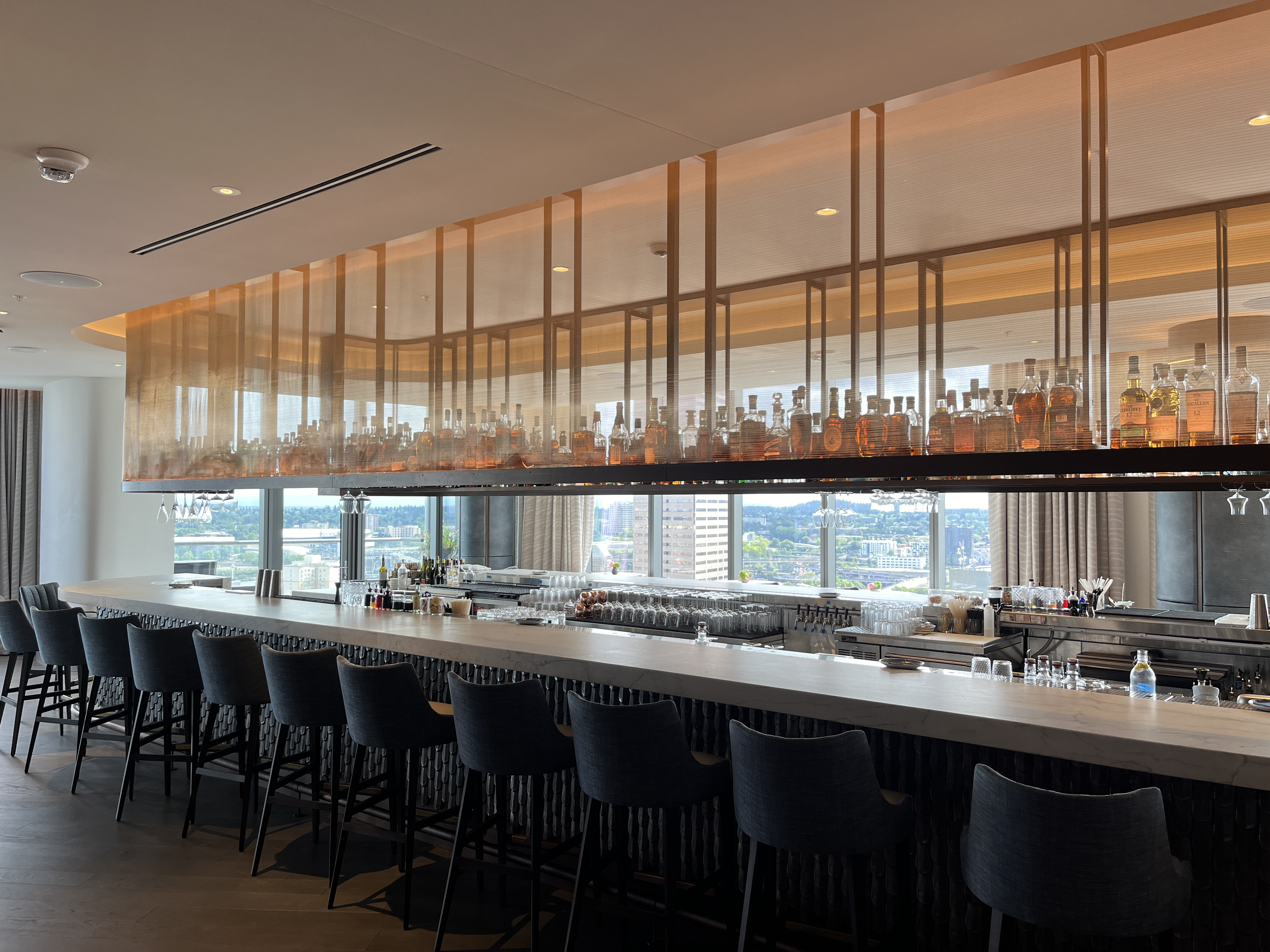
Interior of Bellpine

The hotel's flagship restaurant Bellpine is housed on the 20th floor. Named after the volcanic soil found in Oregon vineyards, Bellpine opened on October 31, 2023, serving New American and Pacific Northwest cuisine. The culinary team includes executive chef Pedro Almeida and chef Lauro Romero. According to Wine Spectator, the restaurant "blends Portuguese cuisine with the traditions of Japanese cooking".

The restaurant has views of Mount Hood and an interior inspired by Oregon's nature. According to Gallivan, Bellpine's design "is evocative of the nearby dramatic Oregon coastline and sculpted as if by the tides of the sea with inspiration from the Haystack Rock formations and the flora and fauna of the tidepools". He also said the restaurant's logo "reflects the longitude/latitude degree mark with a tall B" to connote Bellpine's "impressive" elevation. The menu has included a "shrimp and grits" corn dog, Chinook salmon on an English muffin with cucumber relish, a New York-style strip steak, tagliatelle al pesto, roasted pumpkin bisque, an albacore tataki-style salad, and avocado toast with Dungeness crab.

Jocelyn Chacón is the chef de cuisine.

== History ==
The hotel was slated to open on October 31, 2023. A ribbon cutting ceremony and grand opening was planned. The hotel's interior was designed by ROAM Interior Design (formerly known as HKS Hospitality Interiors). In 2024, the president and chief executive of the Portland Metro Chamber called the hotel a "signal to other companies that Portland has rebounded from the pandemic and is in a moment of generational change", and Esquire magazine recognized the Ritz-Carlton as one of the best new hotels.

== Reception ==
The property ranked third in the best hotels category of The Oregonian's Readers Choice Awards in 2026.
