= Feast Portland =

Annual food festival in Portland, Oregon, United States

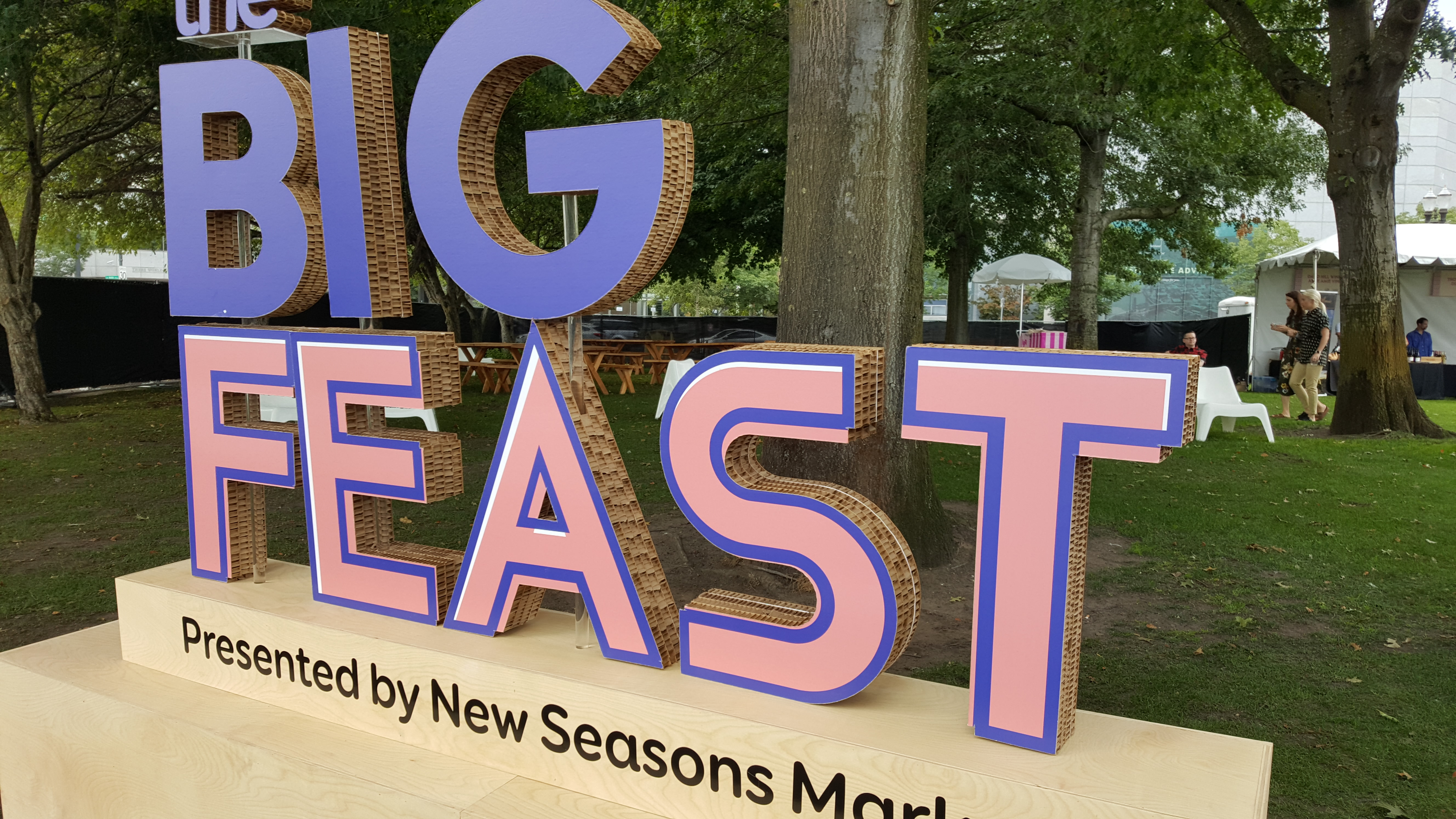
- Signage for the "Big Feast" event at Tom McCall Waterfront Park in 2019
- Status: Inactive
- Frequency: Annually
- Location: Portland, Oregon
- Country: United States
- Website: feastportland.com

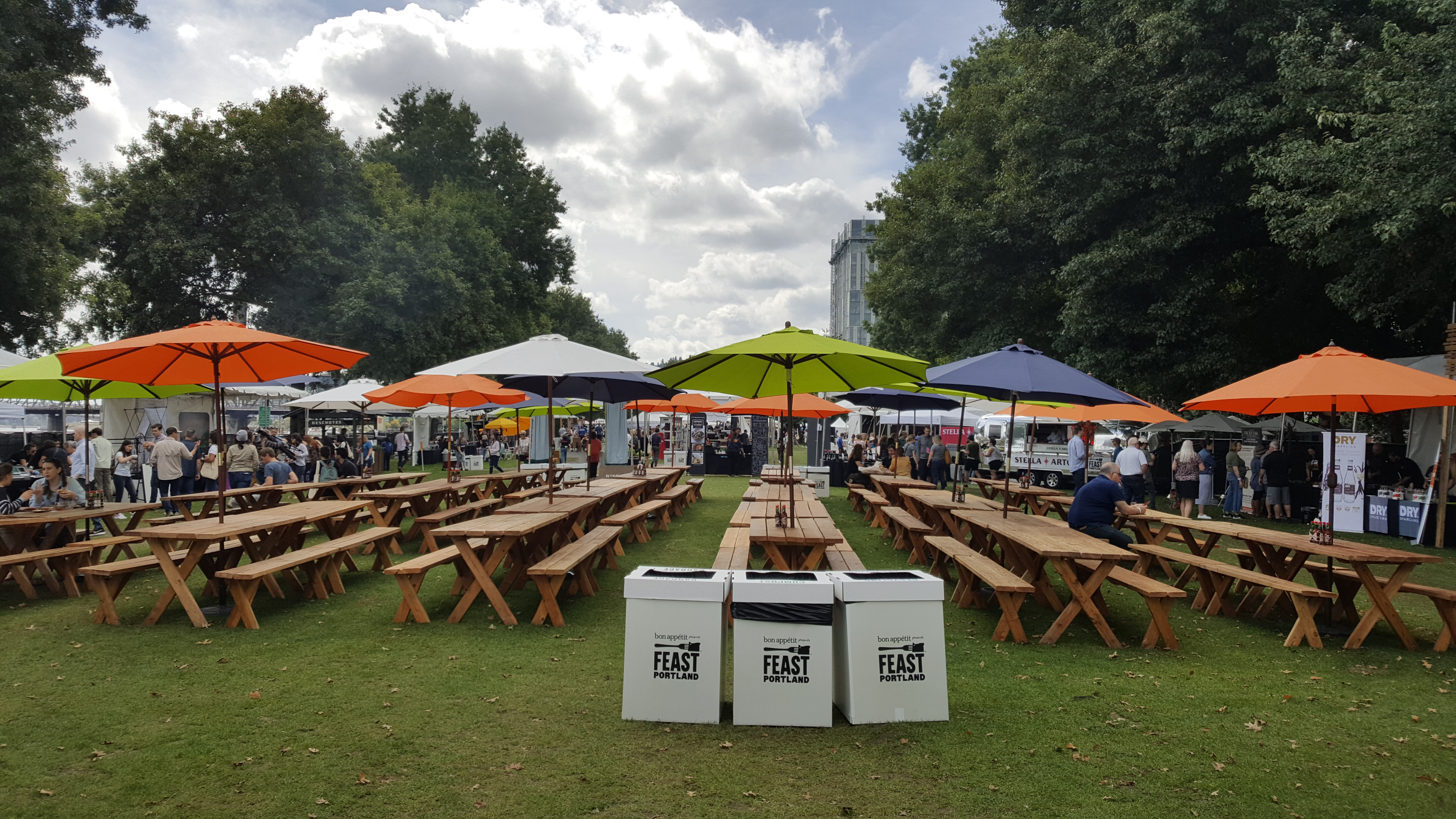
Seating area at the start of the "Big Feast", 2019

Feast Portland was an annual food festival in Portland, Oregon, United States. According to Eater, Feast Portland was the largest "celebration of food and drink" in the Pacific Northwest.

== History ==
The event was established in 2012, co-founded by Carrie Welch and Mike Thelin.

The main event for 2019 (called "Big Feast") was held at Tom McCall Waterfront Park. The cast of the television series Stumptown attended. In May 2020, organizers announced the event planned for September would not be possible because of the COVID-19 pandemic. In 2022, organizers announced the event would not return.

== See also ==
- Culture of Portland, Oregon
