= E. Reese Hopkins =

American radio talk show host

Reese Hopkins is an American radio talk show host also known as E. Reese Hopkins. Hopkins was a news anchor and news director for the Star and Bucwild show. From December 2007 to October 2008, he hosted a midday show for Boston station WRKO.

== Radio career ==
E. Reese Hopkins officially began his radio career in April 2001 as a writer for the Star & Buc Wild radio show at Hot 97. He introduced himself by faxing fake news to the show. As a result of his comedic pieces being read on air, he was offered a news anchor position. Hopkins stayed in that position until 2005. Hopkins resigned from the show in October 2005, seeking new opportunities in radio.

Hopkins took two years off from radio, and moved with his family to Fort Lee, New Jersey. He managed a tile warehouse and produced a program for Howard 100 on Sirius Satellite Radio. In October 2007, he auditioned for an on-air position after a call from WRKO station manager John Capuano. After a successful audition station management offered him a slot in December 2007. He was fired from WRKO Boston on October 16, 2008 as part of company wide cost cutting in the face of declining revenues and stock prices. He was replaced by Laura Ingraham, a syndicated talk host.

== Controversies ==
=== College degree ===
In April 2008, challenges were made to Hopkins' claims that he graduated from Fordham University in 1991. In an interview with the Boston Herald, Hopkins said he graduated under a different name, citing "legal reasons". He added, "I had to go to college either under an emancipated name or under a guardianship, which is under my father’s name. It’s a private matter. I did graduate from Fordham University."

=== Rape allegations ===
On October 22, 2008, a week after being let go by WRKO, Hopkins was arrested at his Malden, Massachusetts home on a fugitive from justice charge. It is alleged that Hopkins raped a 12-year-old girl some four years earlier. He waived extradition to New York City, where he was charged with two counts of rape. One in the first degree, one in the second degree and one charge of endangering the welfare of a child.

In a statement to the press, Hopkins denied the charges stating:

“She charged me on Oct. 1 of 2004. I was living in Manchester, Connecticut. I couldn’t have been there.”

Not being able to make bail of $100,000 cash or $300,000 bond, Hopkins was held at Rikers Island for 2 1/2 years. In November 2009, he was offered a deal of time served if he pleaded guilty to a lower sexual offense and register as a sex offender. Hopkins professed his innocence and turned the deal down. He was finally put on trial March 2, 2011, when jury selection began. During the trial, Hopkins' accuser changed her story and the investigating detective was cut from the witness list. The trial ended in a mistrial on March 24, 2011 after two days of deliberation when eight of the jurors voted not guilty on all charges, and all but one juror voted not guilty on the most serious charge of child rape. Hopkins was finally freed on bail April 6, 2011, after bail was dropped to $20,000. The prosecutor promised to file for a re-trial; however, the arrest of Hopkin's accuser on a gun charge has muddied the case, and a re-trial has not been filed.

Reese's memoir, "Those Who Trespass Against Us: The People Vs Reese On The Radio, presents his account and trial notes of the 2008 arrest and 2011 trial.
