= Shalom Y'all =

Restaurant in Portland, Oregon, U.S.

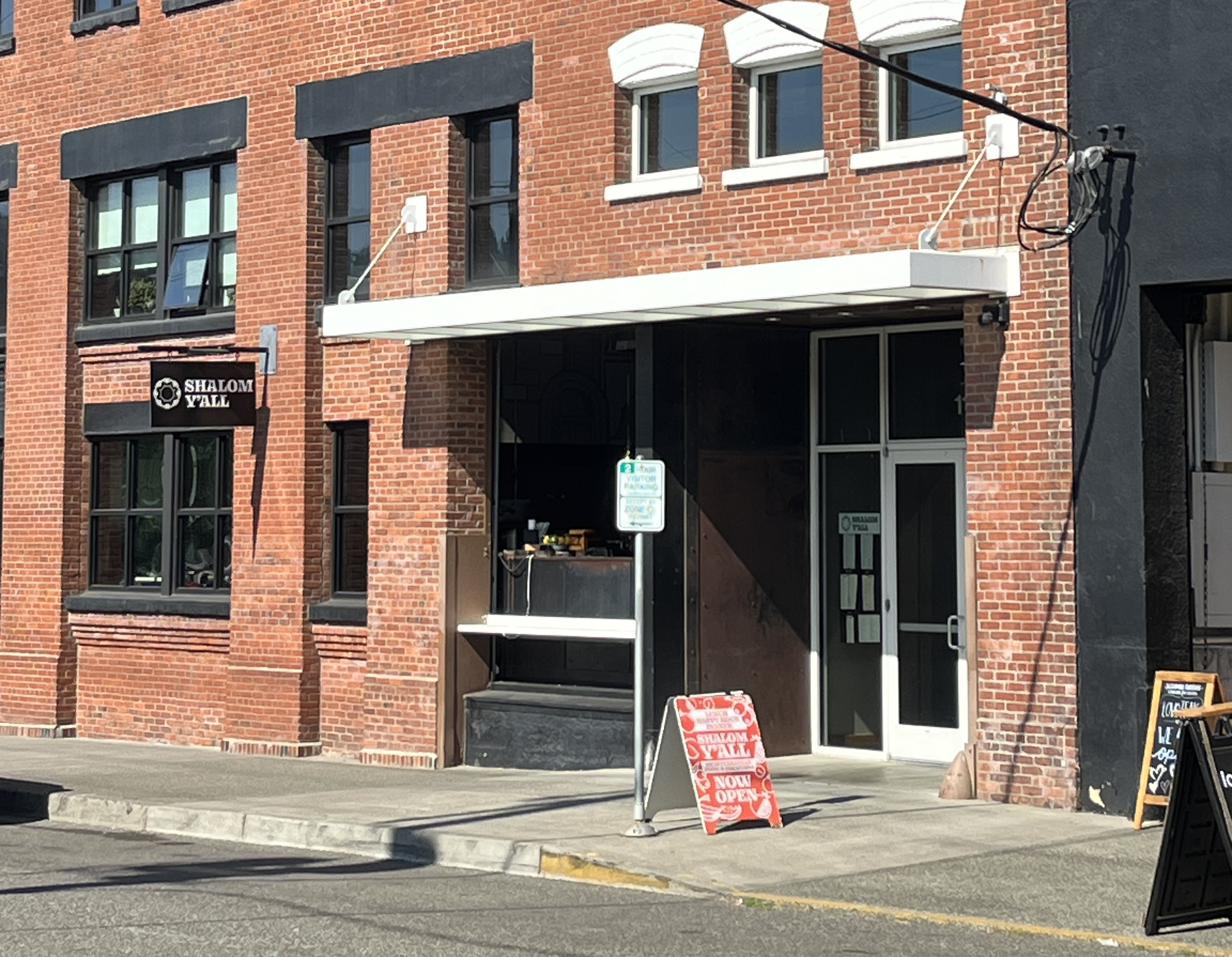
- Exterior of the restaurant in Buckman, Portland, Oregon, 2025
- Interactive map of Shalom Y'all

Restaurant information
- Food type: Israeli; Mediterranean; Middle Eastern
- Location: Portland, Oregon, United States
- Coordinates: 45°30′54.8″N 122°39′51.8″W

Shalom Y'all (sometimes stylized as Shalom Y'all!) is a restaurant serving Israeli, Mediterranean, and Middle Eastern cuisine in Portland, Oregon, United States. There were two locations, before one restaurant rebranded as Lil' Shalom. Lil' Shalom closed permanently in 2025.

== Description ==
Shalom Y'all is a restaurant in southeast Portland's Buckman neighborhood. Portland Monthly has described the restaurant as an "Israeli street food kitchen". The menu has included cucumber-kohlrabi salads, hummus plates with maitake mushrooms or braised lamb, oregano-perfumed lambchops, muhamara, a blackberry Manischewitz-spiked spritzer, and flatbread with a roasted pepper spread and pomegranate molasses. Both Shalom Y'all and its spin-off Lil' Shalom have served corn ribs.

== History ==
The original restaurant was established in May 2016, initially operating in the Pine Street Market. The business relocated to 1128 Southwest Alder Street in 2017.

Plans for a second location in southeast Portland were announced in November 2017. The outpost opened in February 2018.

The business is operated by Sesame Collective. Laura Amans, Jamal Hassan, Kasey Mills are co-owners.

The restaurant's phone system was hacked in 2019. In January 2021, both locations were vandalized with anti-Israel graffiti. Michael Russell of The Oregonian wrote in 2021:

Shalom Y'all was first opened by former Portland chef John Gorham and his business partner Ron Avni, whose family owns the Israeli dude ranch Vered Hagalil, where "Shalom, Y'all" hangs above the reception desk. The Toro Bravo restaurant group was dissolved in July after Gorham, incensed over vandals spray painted the group's catering vans, directed a violent Facebook outburst toward a trans woman of color. Operating as the new Sesame Collective, longtime Toro Bravo employees Mills, Hassan and Amans took over both Shalom Y'all locations as well as sister restaurants Mediterranean Exploration Company, the then under-development Yalla as well as two outposts of burger spot Bless Your Heart. At the time, the new group removed its "Israeli street food" descriptor, while keeping its menu the same.

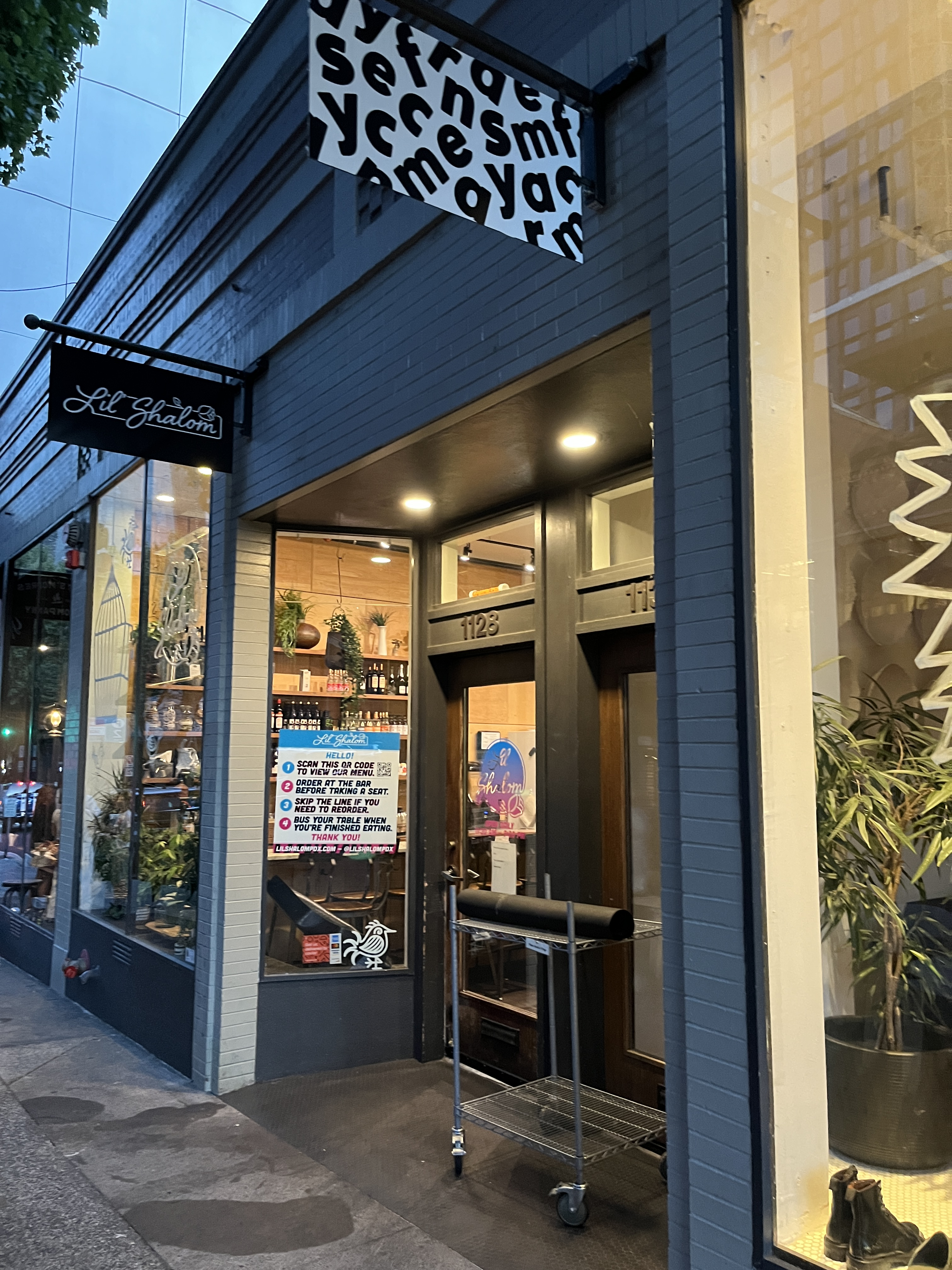
Exterior of Lil' Shalom, 2022

In mid 2021, the Alder Street location closed and rebranded as Lil' Shalom. The Shalom Y'all on Southeast Taylor Street continued to operate as usual.

=== Lil' Shalom ===
The spin-off restaurant Lil' Shalom was also operated by Sesame Collective. It served Mediterranean cuisine. Co-owner Mills was the executive chef. Caleb Rose was a sous-chef. The restaurant closed permanently on April 30, 2025.

== Reception ==
Shalom Y'all ranked second in the Best Mediterranean Restaurant category of Willamette Week's annual 'Best of Portland' readers' poll in 2022, 2024, and 2025.

== See also ==
- List of Middle Eastern restaurants
