= Kinboshi Ramen =

Restaurant in Portland, Oregon, U.S.

- Exterior of the Southeast Ankeny restaurant, 2021
- Interactive map of Kinboshi Ramen

Restaurant information
- Food type: Japanese
- Location: 609 SE Ankeny Street, Portland, Oregon, United States
- Coordinates: 45°31′20″N 122°39′34″W
- Website: kinboshiramen.com

Kinboshi Ramen is a Japanese restaurant in Portland, Oregon, United States. Two locations that were originally part of Marukin Ramen were rebranded in 2021. One Kinboshi has since closed.

== Description ==
The Japanese restaurant Kinboshi Ramen operates in Portland, Oregon. The menu has included vegan and vegetarian options such as regular and spicy versions of miso and a soy milk-based shio tonyu ramen.

== History ==
Interior of Kinboshi Ramen in southeast Portland, 2021

Marukin Ramen opened two shops in Portland in 2016. According to the Portland Tribune, the Pine Street location was "sought out to honor Old Town's Japanese heritage". The two shops became known as Kinboshi Ramen in 2021. One location has since closed.

== Reception ==
Seiji Nanbu included Kinboshi in Eater Portland's 2022 overview of "where to find knockout ramen in Portland and beyond". The website's Waz Wu included the business in a 2024 overview of the city's best vegan noodle soups. In 2022, Willamette Week included Kinboshi's chicken paitan ramen in a list of the city's "souper stars". The restaurant was a runner-up in the Best Ramen category of the newspaper's annual 'Best of Portland' readers' poll in 2022 and 2024. It was a finalist in the same category in 2025 and 2026.

Kinboshi ranked third in The Oregonian's annual Readers Choice Awards in 2024. Katrina Yentch included Kinboshi in the website's 2025 overview of the best restaurants in the Buckman neighborhood. Noms Magazine included Kinboshi in a 2024 overview of Portland's ten best ramen options. Jenn Carnevale selected Kinboshi for Oregon in The Daily Meal's 2026 overview of the best ramen restaurants in each U.S. state.

== See also ==
- History of Japanese Americans in Portland, Oregon
- List of Japanese restaurants
