= Artly Coffee =

Coffee company based in Seattle, Washington, U.S.

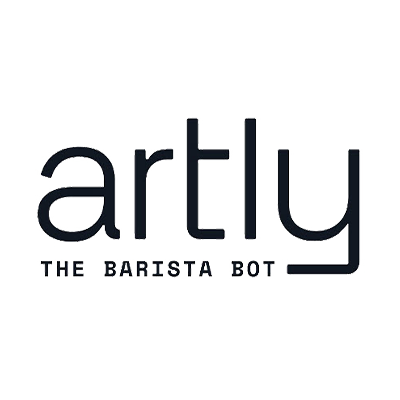

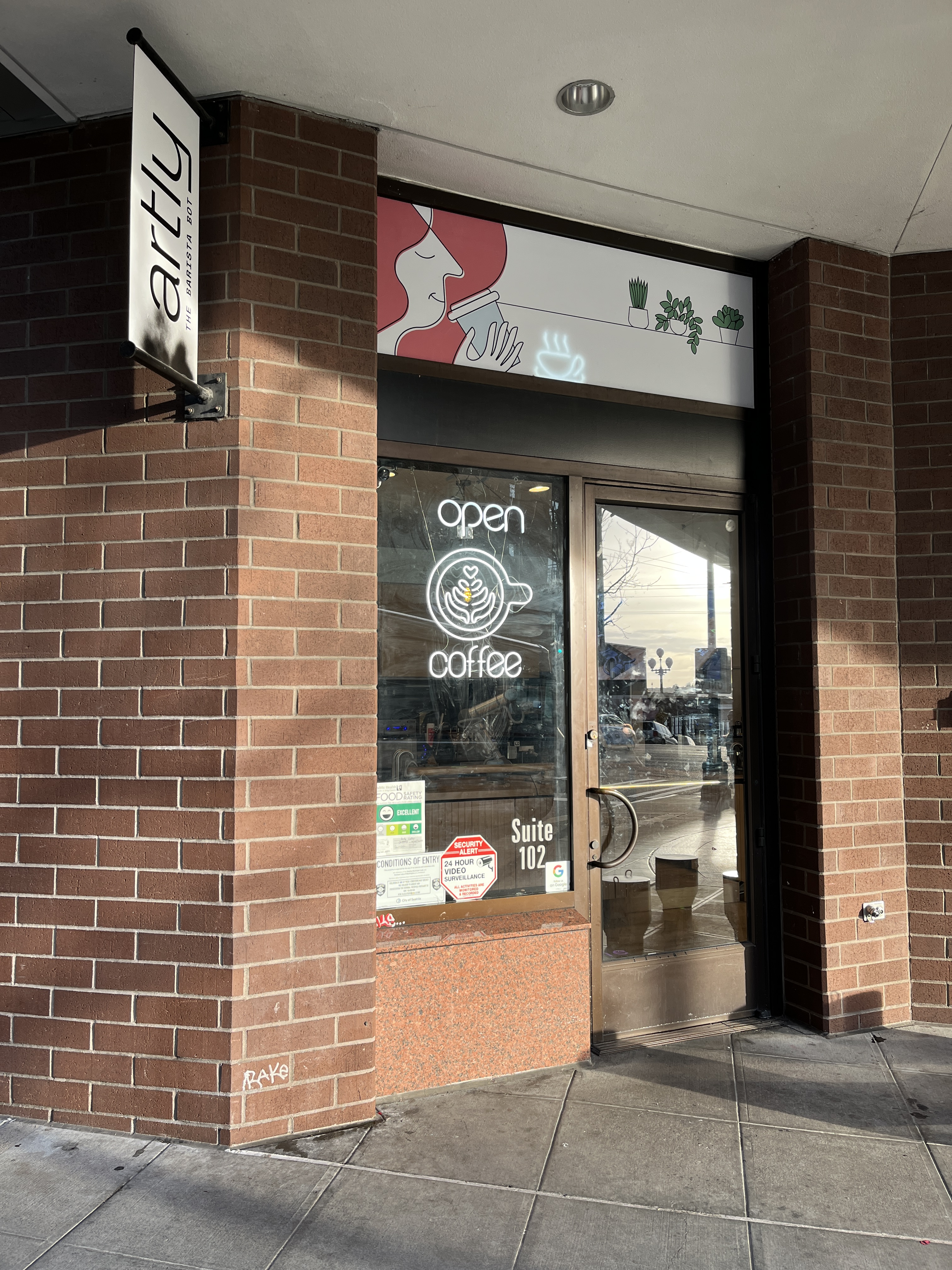
- Exterior of the Artly Coffee shop in Downtown Seattle, 2023

Artly Coffee is a chain of coffee shops featuring robot baristas, based in Seattle, Washington, United States. Meng Wang is a co-founder.

== History ==
The business closed an $8 million investment round in 2022. In 2023, the company's owner Wenbo Yang won first place in the Brewers Cup category and runner-up in Latte Art category at the U.S. Coffee Championships.

=== Locations ===
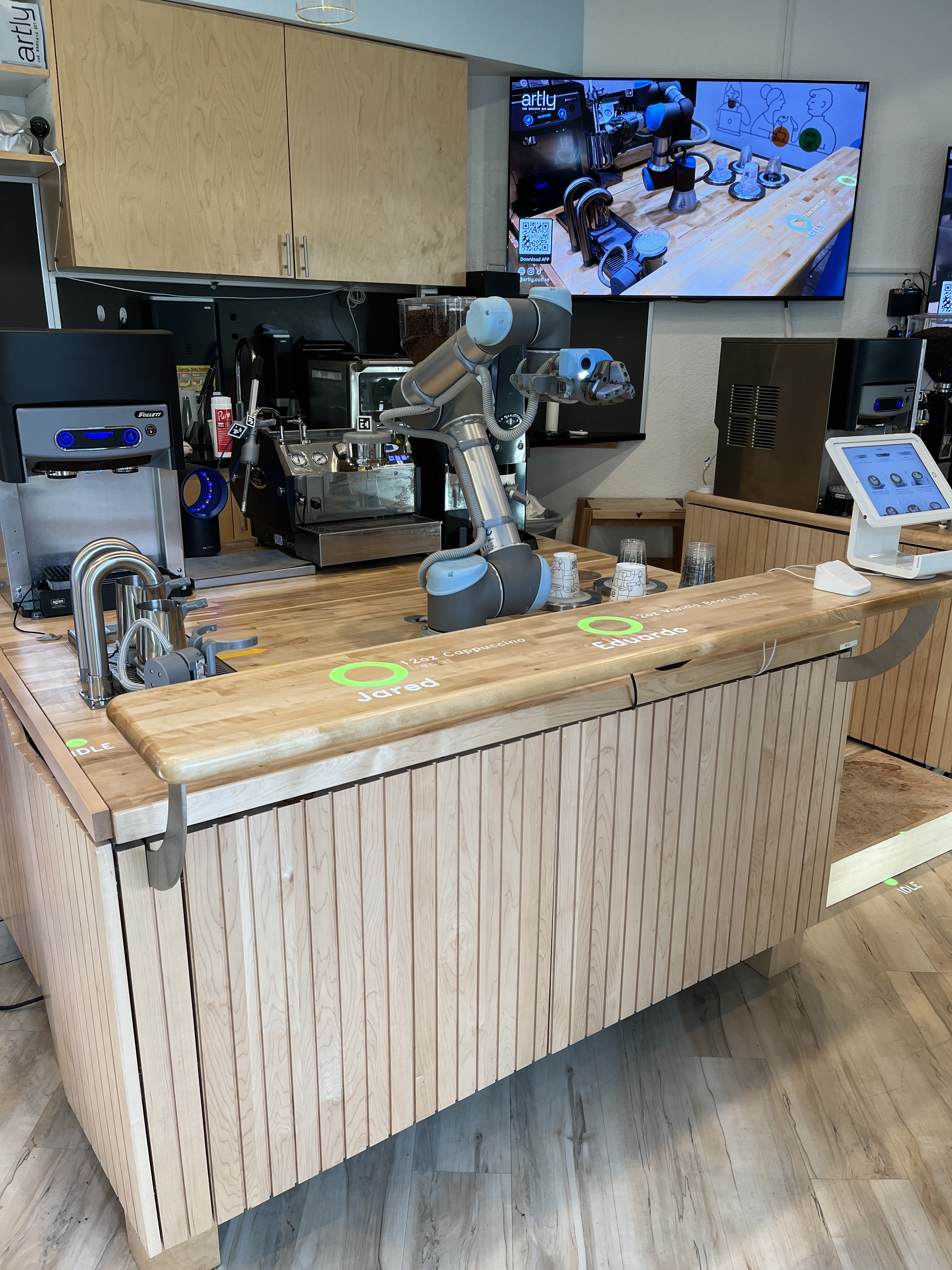
Interior of the Downtown Seattle location in 2023

The business has operated in Portland, Oregon. As of January 2023, there were seven locations, including one in Washington State.

- 101 Stewart Street, Downtown Seattle, Washington
- Stonestown Galleria 3251 20th Ave, San Francisco, California
- Pier 39 The Embarcadero, San Francisco, California

The business has also operated at Washington Square Mall in Oregon.

== See also ==
- List of coffeehouse chains
- List of restaurant chains in the United States
