= Yavilah McCoy =

American nonprofit founder (born 1972)

Yavilah McCoy (born November 8, 1972), an African-American Jew, is the founder of Ayecha, a nonprofit organization providing educational resources for Jewish diversity and advocacy for Jews of Color in the United States. She is a teacher, writer, editor, and diversity consultant.

== Activism and professional career ==
In 2008, after directing Ayecha for eight years, Yavilah assumed the New England directorship of The Curriculum Initiative, (TCI), a non-profit educational consultancy.

In 2009, Yavilah McCoy co-wrote and performed “The Colors of Water,” an original theatrical piece that tells the story of the four generations of her African-American Jewish family, as part of Mayyim Hayyim’s Living Waters International Mikveh Conference in Newton, Massachusetts.

== Early life ==
McCoy attended school in the Crown Heights, Brooklyn area, and studied at Hebrew University of Jerusalem. McCoy's great-grandmother "took off the shackle of Christianity, so to speak, and took on the religion of Israel,” McCoy said. “All she had to guide her was the Bible, so my great-grandmother developed an appreciation for the ethics and morality found in the stories of the people of Israel, and her songs were the songs of David.” The family moved to Brownsville, Brooklyn and McCoy's grandmother converted to Judaism when she married. Her father converted to Orthodox Judaism in his early 20s. McCoy and five siblings were raised in an Orthodox Jewish home in the East Flatbush and Crown Heights areas of Brooklyn.

== Ayecha ==
McCoy founded and directed Ayecha for eight years. With offices in New York City and St. Louis, Ayecha provided training and support for Jewish and multiracial families. In 2009, when asked by the Forward how she felt about being a representative for Jews of color, McCoy acknowledged her own accomplishments but also underscored the need for increased visibility and representation, within the media and Jewish leadership, of a spectrum of Jews of color:

I’ve stepped back from being “the one,” because in a way I had become an icon of this work. The idea of associating diversity with a person as opposed to it being a movement within the Jewish community was starting to bother me. So, I made the decision about a year ago to spend more of my time supporting fellow Jewish leaders of color so that when the conversation re-emerged, it would be a conversation along the lines of, maybe, 10 different stories instead of one.

== Personal life ==
McCoy's husband is also African-American and Jewish. They live in Boston, and have four children.
