= Beer party (disambiguation) =

A beer party is a party with beer drinking.

Beer Party may also refer to:

- The Beer Party (Austria)
- Ukrainian Beer Lovers Party
- Beer Lovers Party (Belarus)
- Beer Lovers Party (Russia)
- Friends of Beer Party
- Lower Excise Fuel and Beer Party
- Polish Beer-Lovers' Party
