= Pine Street Market =

Food hall in Portland, Oregon, U.S.

- Logo

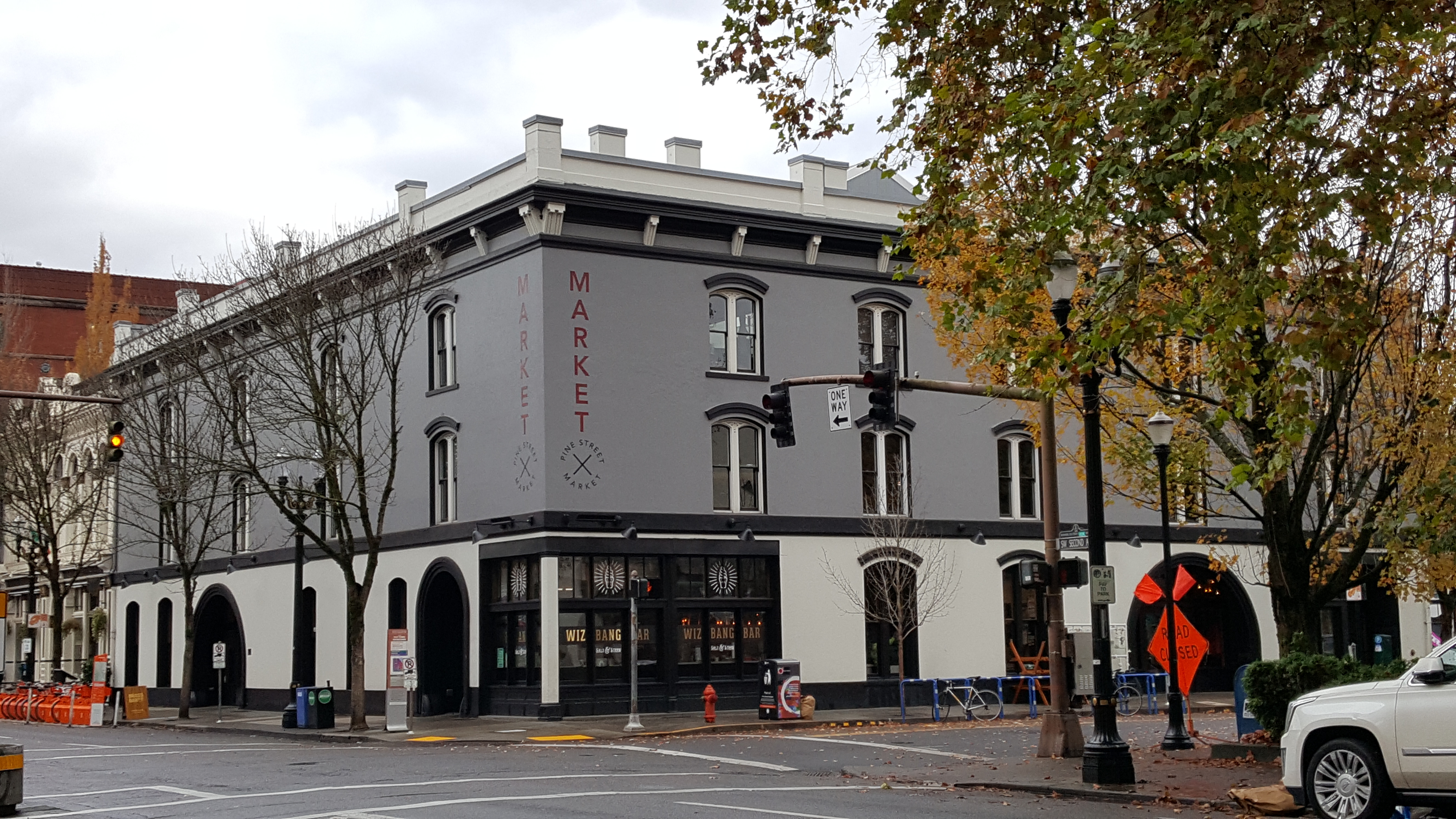
- The building's exterior in 2017
- Interactive map of the Pine Street Market area

General information
- Location: Old Town Chinatown, Portland, Oregon, United States
- Coordinates: 45.52145°N 122.67234°W
- Opened: 2016

Pine Street Market is a food hall in the United Carriage and Baggage Transfer Building in the Old Town Chinatown neighborhood of Portland, Oregon, United States. The market is curated by Feast Portland co-founder Mike Thelin. The building's renovation cost $5 million.

== History ==
The market opened in April 2016. Jean-Pierre Veillet attempted to sell the market starting in 2023.

=== Tenants ===
Tenants in the 10,000-square-foot (930 m^{2}) space have included:

- Blends Juice Bar
- Bless Your Heart Burgers
- Brass Bar: coffees, teas
- La Carreta Pura Vida
- Common Law: European-Asian food, and alcoholic beverages
- Hurry Back Curry
- Kinboshi Ramen: Japanese ramen chain (formerly Marukin Ramen)
- Lil' Funky Donuts
- Little Thai Peacock
- Matsunoki Ramen
- OP Wurst (by Olympia Provisions): frankfurters
- Pleasure Burger
- Pollo Bravo: standing bar, tapas, rotisserie chicken
- Shanghai's Best
- Shalom Y'all: Israeli-inspired street-food
- Tita's Juice Bar
- Trifecta Annex: toast, bread, pizza
- Wiz Bang Bar (by Salt & Straw): ice cream shop

== Reception ==
Emily Iris Degn included Pine Street Market in Tasting Table's 2025 list of thirteen "must-visit" food halls in the U.S.

== See also ==
- James Beard Public Market
- Portland Saturday Market
