= Birrieria La Plaza =

Mexican restaurant in Portland, Oregon, U.S.

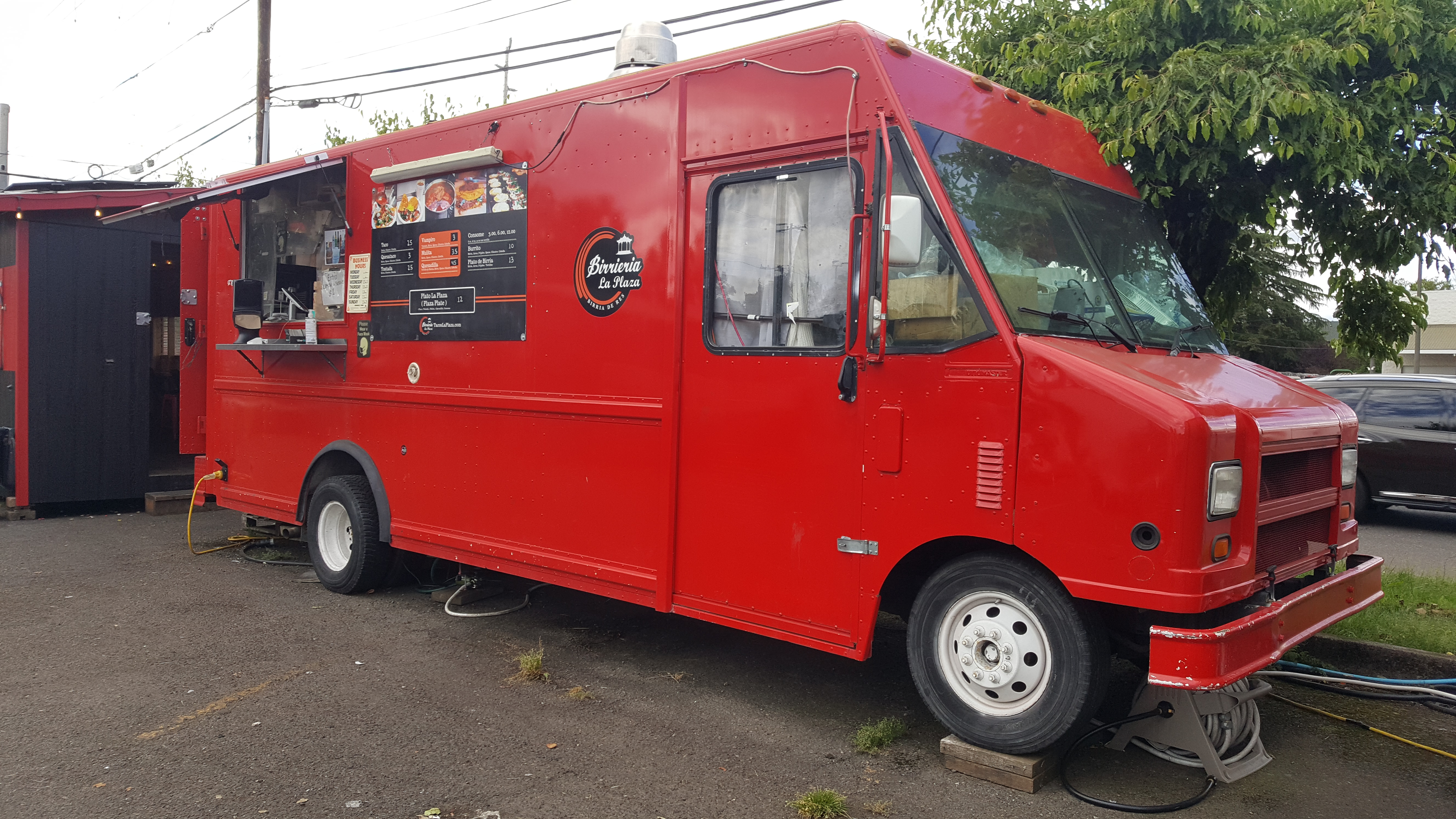
- The restaurant in 2022
- Interactive map of Birrieria La Plaza

Restaurant information
- Owner: Oracio Hernandez
- Food type: Mexican
- Location: 600 Southeast 146th Avenue, Portland, Multnomah, Oregon, 97233, United States
- Coordinates: 45.5190°N 122.5128°W
- Website: tacoslaplaza.com

Birrieria La Plaza is a Mexican restaurant in Portland, Oregon, United States. Initially operating from a food cart in southeast Portland, the business has opened a brick and mortar location and operates a stall at Flock, the food hall in downtown Portland's Block 216.

== Description ==
The Mexican restaurant Birrieria La Plaza (BLP) operates in Portland, Oregon. The menu focuses on birria and also includes braised beef and vampiros. The Plaza Plate includes a quesadilla, taco, mulita, tostada, and a cup of consommé.

== History ==
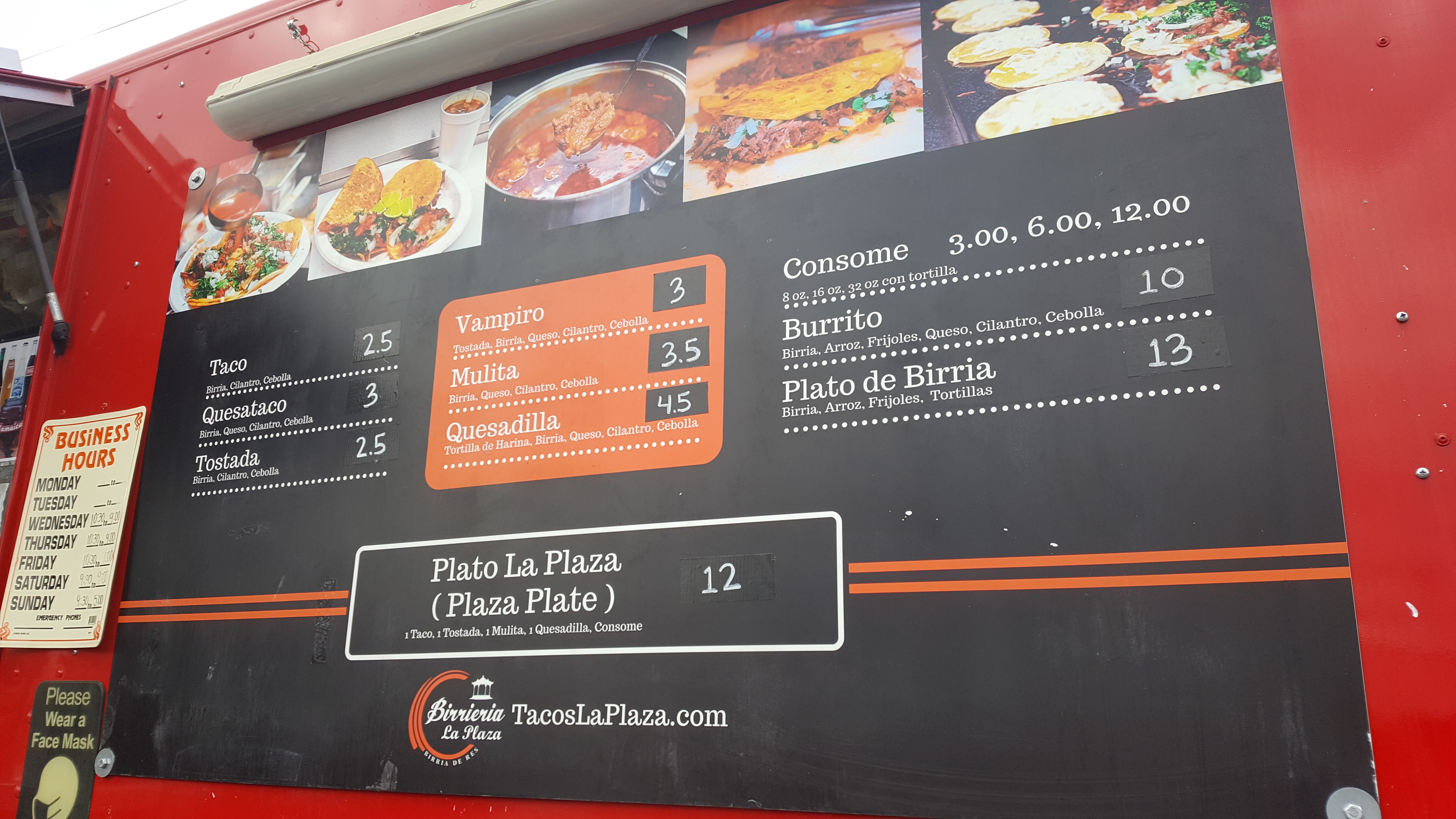
Menu display, 2022

Owned by Oracio Hernandez, BLP originally operated from a red food cart on Stark Street in southeast Portland, in the parking lot of a discount store.

During the COVID-19 pandemic, the restaurant experienced setbacks from beef supply chain issues. In May 2020, Rachel Pinsky of Eater Portland wrote, "At the height of its success a couple months ago, Hernandez’s food cart was going through a thousand pounds of chuck roast a week to make this popular stew. On May 4, the prices offered by his meat supplier for chuck increased by 200 percent. Hernandez was forced to temporarily shut down to find another reliable source of affordable meat."

In January 2023, Eater Portland said the business plans to open a brick and mortar restaurant in the Southeast Division space that previously housed Andale Andale, followed by a stall in the food hall Flock in downtown Portland's at Block 216. The business was a vendor when Flock opened on February 2, 2025.

BLP closed for the nationwide Day Without Immigrants protest in 2025.

== Reception ==
Michael Russell included BLP in The Oregonian's 2020 list of Portland's ten best new food carts. In 2021, writers for Portland Monthly said, "we believe the honor of best quesabirria taco in Portland goes to Birrieria La Plaza", and Willamette Week said: "The birria boom has hit Portland, and the persistent traffic jam outside Birrieria La Plaza signals that it's the chosen one at the moment."

Krista Garcia included BLP in Eater Portland's 2021 overview of recommended restaurants in Gresham and East Portland. The website said BLP "has quickly become a standout amidst East Portland's birria belt. The restaurant's crunchy vampiros are a particular favorite, but it's worth taking home as much of the restaurant's deeply savory soup as possible." She also included the business in a list of Portland's seventeen "standout" Mexican restaurants and food carts. The website's Zoe Baillargeon included the quesadilla in a list of the "cheesiest" dishes in the metropolitan area, and Nick Woo and Brooke Jackson-Glidden included BLP in a 2021 guide to the city's "most outstanding" food carts. Jackson-Glidden also included the restaurant in Eater Portland's 2022 list of the city's 38 "essential" restaurants and food carts. In 2025, Garcia included BLP in an overview of Portland's best Mexican eateries and the business was also included in the website's list of the city's best food carts.

== See also ==
- Hispanics and Latinos in Portland, Oregon
- List of Mexican restaurants
