= United Carriage and Baggage Transfer Building =

Historic building in Portland, Oregon, U.S.

- U.S. Historic district – Contributing property
- Portland Historic Landmark
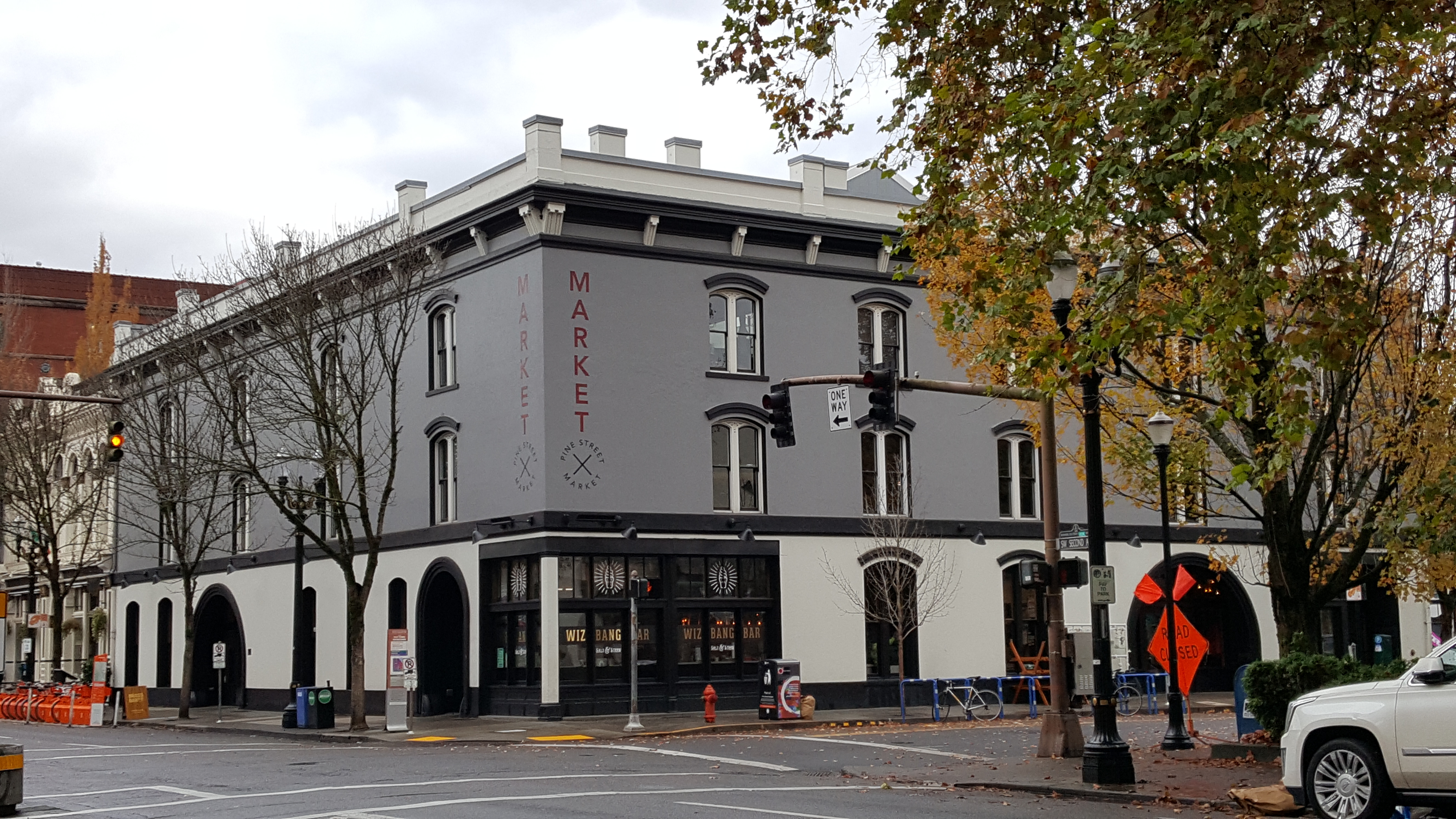
- Exterior of Pine Street Market in 2017

- Location within Portland, Oregon
- Location: 133 SW Pine St. Portland, Oregon
- Coordinates: 45°31′17.25″N 122°40′20.61″W
- Built: 1875 or 1886
- Part of: Portland Skidmore/Old Town Historic District (ID75001597)
- Designated CP: December 6, 1975

The United Carriage and Baggage Transfer Building is an historic building in Portland, Oregon's Old Town Chinatown neighborhood, completed in 1886 (another source says 1875). It is a contributing property in the Portland Skidmore/Old Town Historic District, which was listed on the U.S. National Register of Historic Places in 1975 and designated a National Historic Landmark District in 1977. Its ground floor currently houses the Pine Street Market.

The building was designated a Portland Historic Landmark by the city's Historic Landmarks Commission in 1969. It had been the location of The Old Spaghetti Factory's first restaurant and the youth dance club Quest.
