= Coava Coffee Roasters =

Coffee roaster based in Portland, Oregon, U.S.

- Logo
- Headquarters: Portland, Oregon, United States
- Website: coavacoffee.com

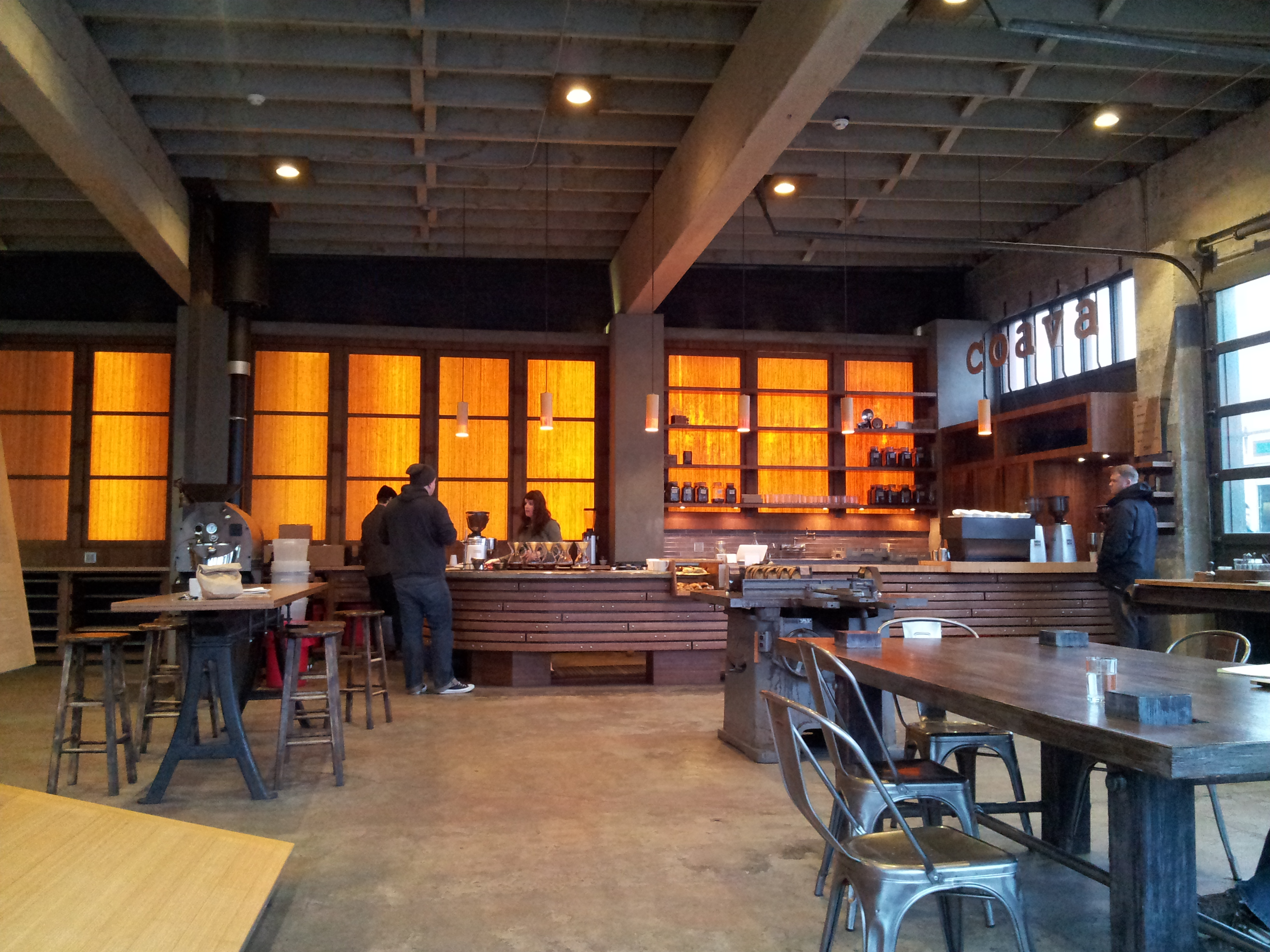
Location in Portland, Oregon, 2014

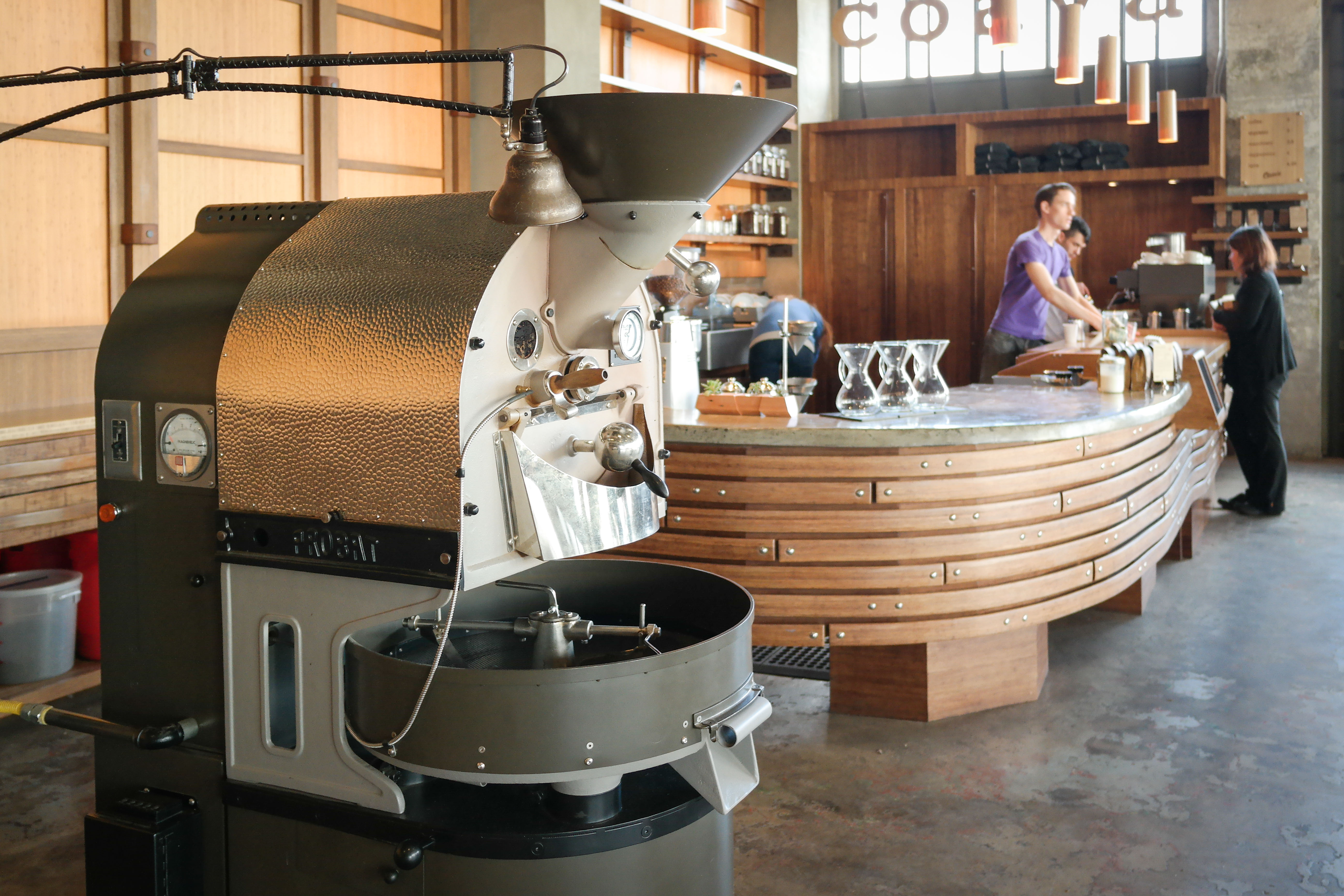
Interior counter, 2014

Coava Coffee Roasters is a coffee roaster based in Portland, Oregon.

== History ==
Matt Higgins started the company in 2008. In 2018, he was named Oregon's small business person of the year.

The company opened its fourth location in downtown Portland in 2017. Another location opened in San Diego in 2017.

The business was featured on Comedians in Cars Getting Coffee. In the episode, Jerry Seinfeld took Fred Armisen to Coava's flagship location in Portland, Oregon.
