= Street plazas in Portland, Oregon =

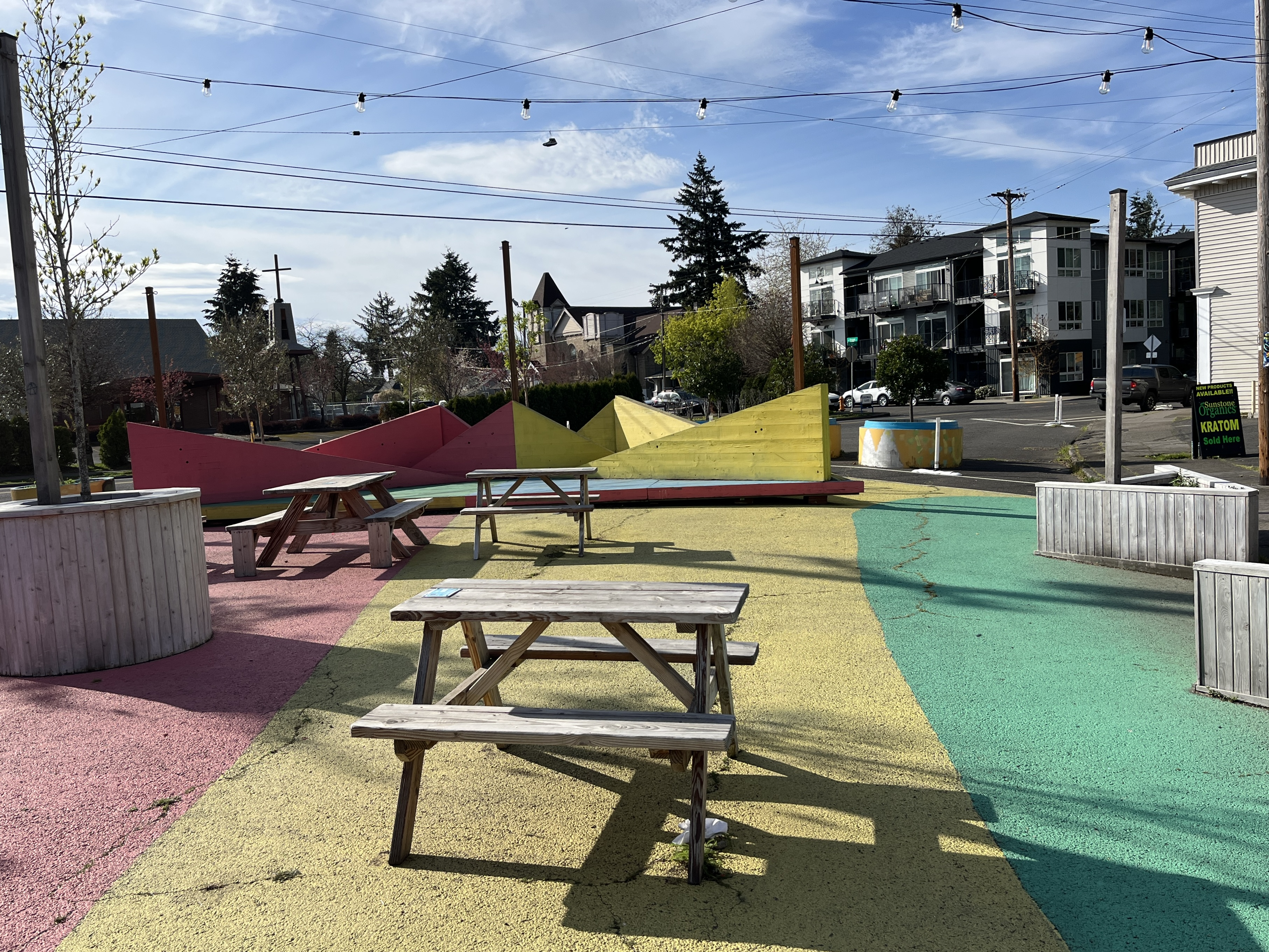
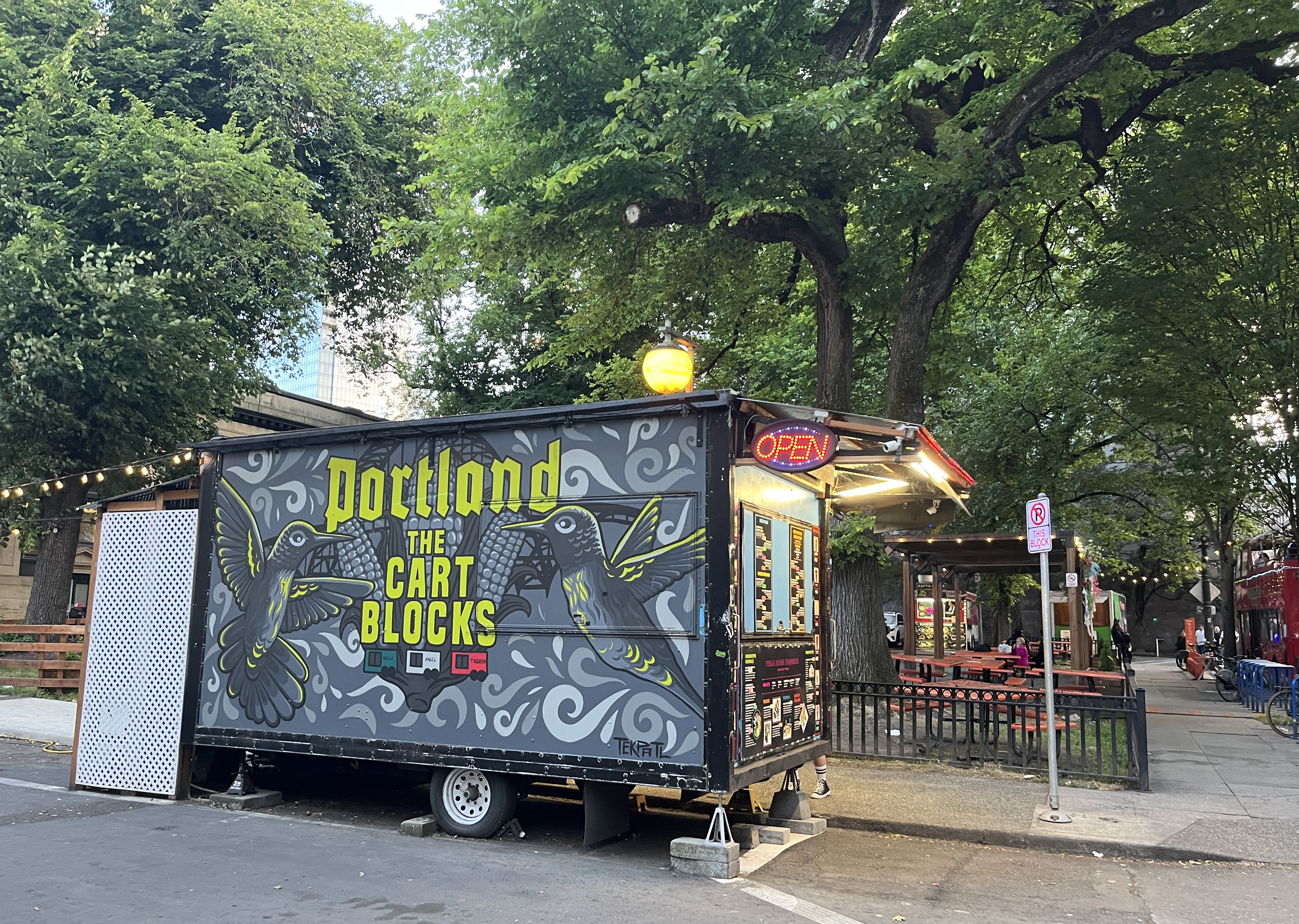
Notable street plazas in Portland, Oregon include Arleta Triangle (top, pictured in 2025) in the Mt. Scott-Arleta neighborhood and the Cart Blocks (bottom, pictured in 2025) on Burnside Street

The American city of Portland, Oregon has 21 public street plazas administered by the Portland Bureau of Transportation (PBOT), as of 2025. The plazas are collectively referred to as the Portland Public Street Plazas. PBOT's public street plaza program started during the COVID-19 pandemic to help businesses and community members host activities in public spaces. According to the city, "The program uses PBOT's Livable Streets Strategy, adopted by Portland City Council in 2017 as its policy foundation to turn streets into inclusive public spaces that foster public life. In 2022 PBOT’s Planning team started work to turn the temporary, pandemic-era program into a permanent Street Plaza program."

Notable plazas include the Cart Blocks, which functions as a food cart pod on Burnside Street in southwest Portland, and the Arleta Triangle in southeast Portland's Mt. Scott-Arleta neighborhood.

== Plazas ==
There were 21 public plazas administered by Portland Bureau of Transportation (PBOT), as of May 2025.

In 2021, PBOT received $1.2 million from the U.S. Economic Development Administration via the American Rescue Plan Act to fund the creation of 32,000 square feet of street plazas for the purpose of economic development and tourism. In her role as Transportation Commissioner, Jo Ann Hardesty had supported and directed the city to apply for funding.

In September 2023, PBOT partnered with the nonprofit trade association MusicPortland to host live music at three of the plazas: Ankeny Rainbow Road in southeast Portland as well as the Cart Blocks and Pride Plaza in southwest Portland.

=== North Portland ===
Plazas in north Portland include Fenwick Plaza, Kenton Plaza, and St. Johns Plaza.

Fenwick Plaza is on Fenwick Avenue between Willis and Interstate Avenues. The plaza opened in April 2021 and the city has considered re-opening the space for car traffic.

Kenton Plaza is on Denver Avenue at Interstate Avenue.

St. Johns Plaza is at Lombard Street and Philadelphia Avenue. The plaza was among multiple gathering sites for the Hands Off protests in April 2025. The event Saturdays in the Square has been hosted in the plaza. St. Johns Plaza has also hosted weekly potlucks.

=== Northeast Portland ===
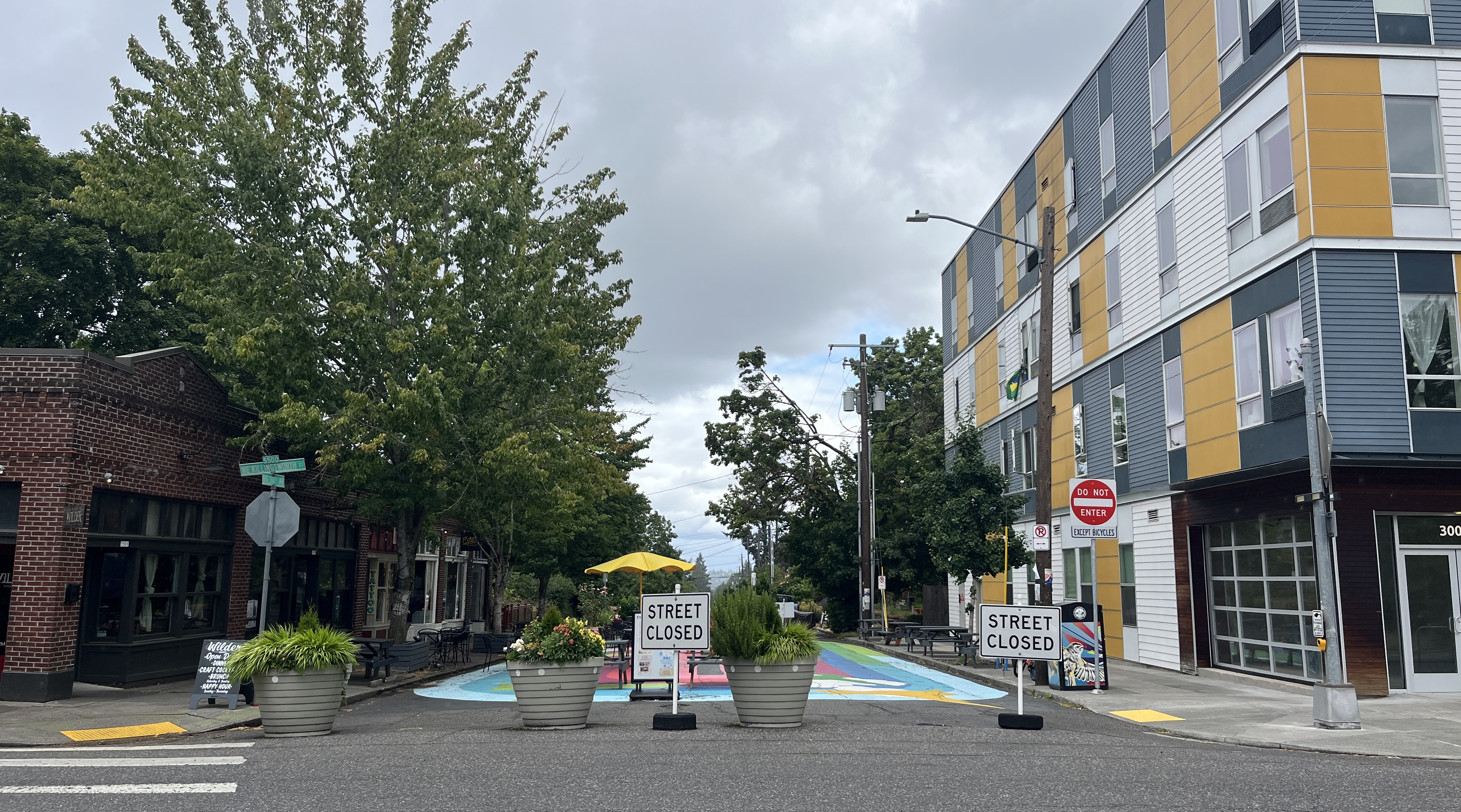
Concordia Commons at the intersection of 30th Avenue and Killingsworth Street in northeast Portland, 2026

Plazas in northeast Portland include Beaumont Crossing, Concordia Commons, Dream Street Plaza, Harold P. Kelley Plaza, Outer Space Plaza, Parkrose Plaza, Roseway Plaza, Stoll Plaza, and Woodlawn Yards.

Beaumont Crossing is located at the intersection of 44th Avenue and Fremont Street. The plaza's grand opening was held on July 11, 2026.

Harold P. Kelley Plaza is on Hancock Street between 42nd Avenue and Sandy Boulevard. The plaza has a Benson Bubbler fountain and has hosted chess.

Outer Space Plaza is at 26th-27th Avenue Alley and Alberta Street.

Parkrose Plaza is located at the intersection of 106th Avenue and Sandy Boulevard. The project is supported by Historic Parkrose. The plaza's launch party was held on July 11, 2026.

Roseway Plaza is at the intersection of 72nd Avenue and Mason Street. A grand opening was held on September 6, 2025. The plaza is supported by the Roseway Neighborhood Association. It features a mural.

Stoll Plaza is on 41st Avenue between Sandy Boulevard and Broadway.

Located on Durham Avenue between Madrona Street and Dekum Street, Woodlawn Yards is supported by the Woodlawn Neighborhood Association. It hosts the Woodlawn Farmers Market.

==== Concordia Commons ====
Concordia Commons is at 30th Avenue and Killingsworth Street. Activities in 2024 included 'MusicPortland', square dancing, a pop-up focuses on art and fashion, qigong, and a one-year anniversary celebration with art, games, and music. Concordia Commons hosted a Spring Garden Fair, game nights, and concerts in 2025.

==== Dream Street Plaza ====
Dream Street Plaza is on Sumner Street at Martin Luther King Jr. Boulevard. The City of Portland has described the plaza as a "Black-centered Space for community and microenterprise in historic Albina". It was established in 2020 and re-opened for its second year in 2021 on May 15. A mural by Edmund Mundo Homes was added to the plaza in 2023. Dream Street Plaza hosted the event 'SoulFul Thursdays', as of 2023.

=== Northwest Portland ===
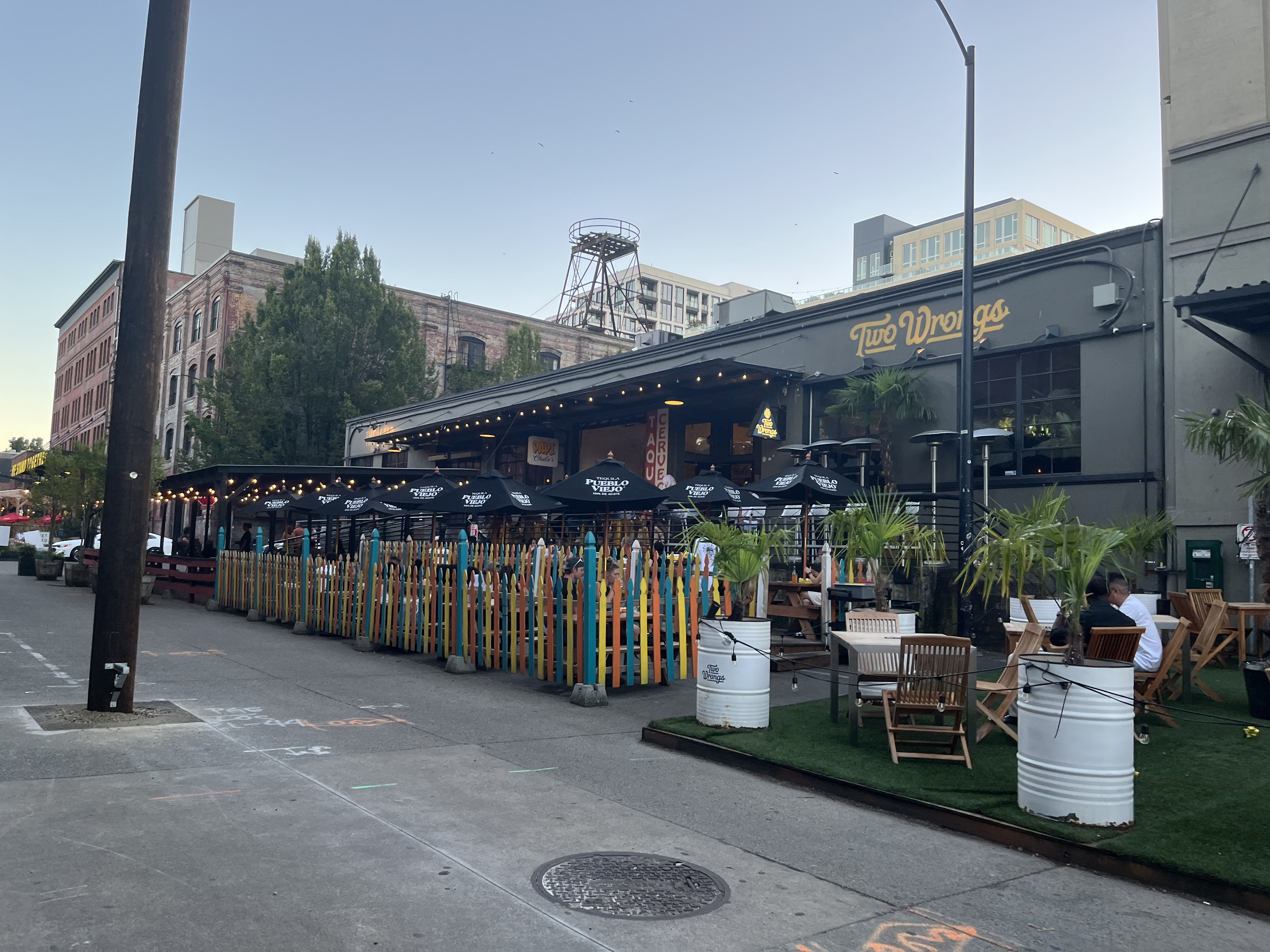
Designated areas for outdoor dining on Northwest 13th Avenue, 2022

In northwest Portland, the 13th Avenue Plaza (or NW 13th Avenue Plaza) is on 13th Avenue between Everett and Irving Streets, in the Pearl District. The plaza has hosted First Thursday, which showcases works by local artists. In 2025, PBOT announced plans to reduce the size of the plaza and restore car traffic to the street.

The Couch Street Plaza debuted on Couch Street between 3rd and 4th in the Old Town Chinatown neighborhood in 2022. The city planned to host events in the vehicle-free zone.

=== Southeast Portland ===
Plazas in southeast Portland include Ankeny Rainbow Road, Arleta Triangle Square (72nd Avenue and Woodstock Boulevard), Clinton Street Plaza, Dream Big Plaza, Hawthorne Plaza, Montavilla Plaza, Schiller Plaza, and Spokane Plaza.

Located at Schiller Street and 72nd Avenue, Schiller Plaza is supported by the Foster-Powell Neighborhood Association. It connects the two halves of the Firland Parkway.

Spokane Plaza (also known as Spokane Street Plaza) is located at the intersection of Spokane Street and 13th Avenue. The plaza has hosted music and a tea party called Tea-Quinox.

==== Ankeny Rainbow Road ====
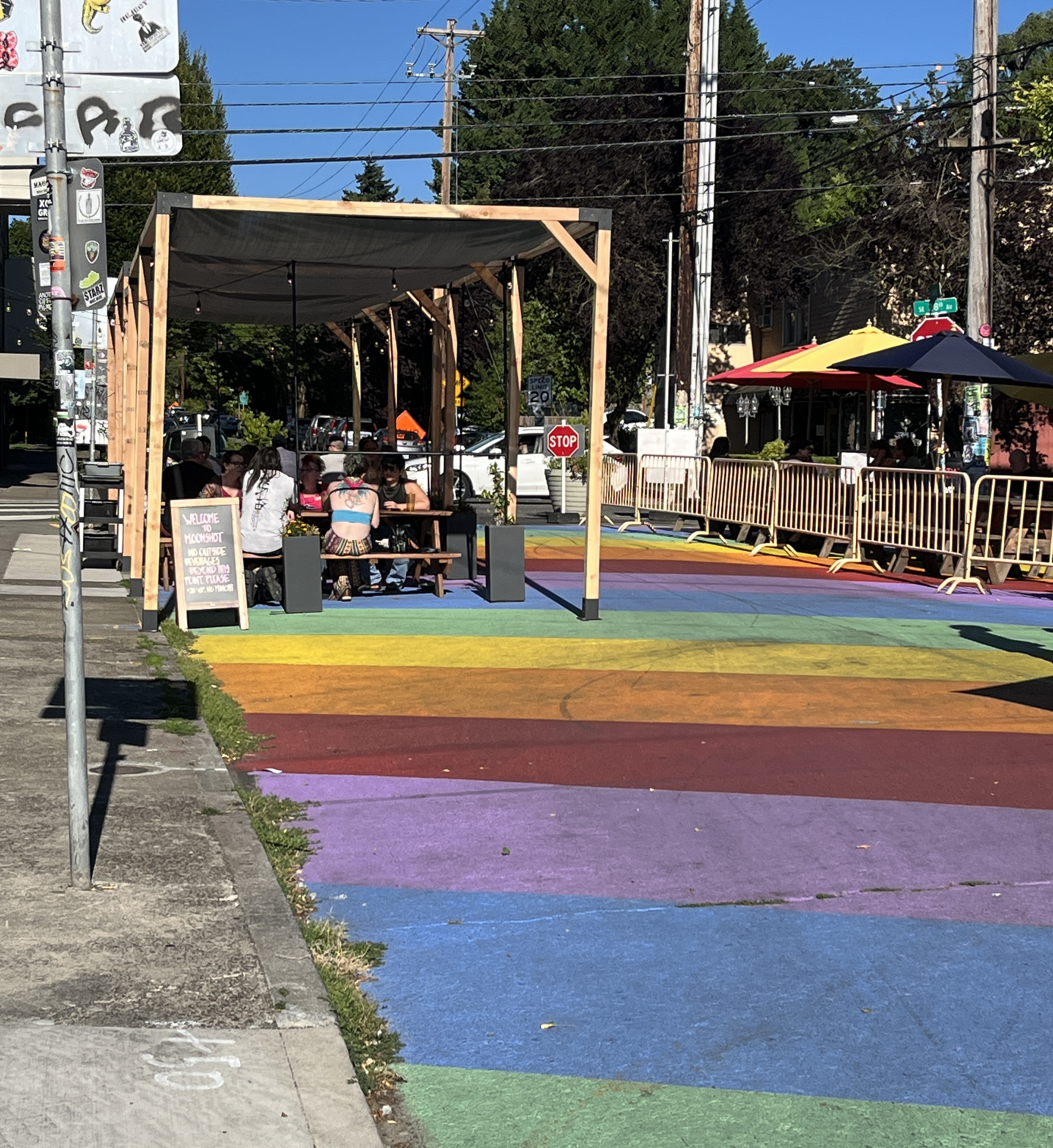
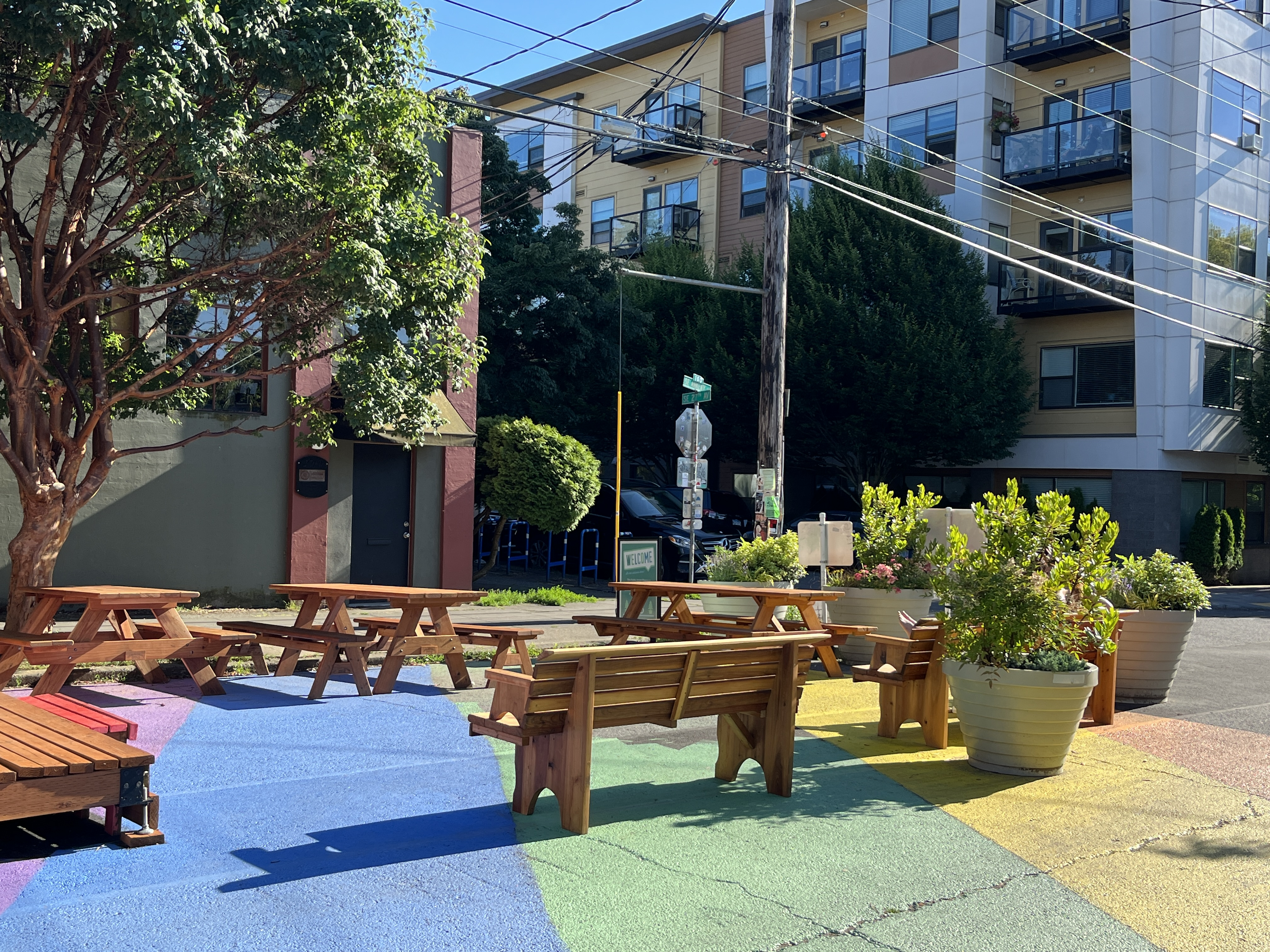
Ankeny Rainbow Road, 2025

Ankeny Rainbow Road is on Ankeny Street between 27th and 28th Avenues, in the Buckman neighborhood at the boundary with Kerns. In mid 2020, during the COVID-19 pandemic, Jonathan Maus of BikePortland said Ankeny Rainbow Road was the city's "best distanced-dining street plaza". The rainbow stripes were "refreshed" in 2023. Volunteers repainted the plaza in April 2025. The plaza has tables and a stage. It has hosted music and a challenge called the "Beer Keg Strongman".

==== Clinton Street Plaza ====
Clinton Street Plaza is on Clinton Street between 25th and 26th Avenues. In 2021, Michael Russell included the plaza in The Oregonian's overview of Portland's best new restaurant and bar patios. He wrote, "A half dozen restaurants and bars came together for this barn raising (er, plaza planting?) last August, with new street seating and covered patios sprouting in front of Dot's Cafe, Magna Kusina, La Moule, Broder Cafe and more, with a bike lane carved down the middle." Russell also included Clinton Street Plaza in the newspaper's 2022 list of the city's 35 "best patios and rooftop bars for outdoor dining this summer".

==== Dream Big Plaza ====
Dream Big Plaza (also known as Portland Dream Plaza) opened at the intersection of 9th Avenue and Taylor Street in July 2025. The space has art, basketball hoops, and skateboard ramps. It is adjacent to an office occupied by the nonprofit organization Dream Big City, which hosts pop-up block parties called "Fam Jams". The group acquired a one-year permit from PBOT to host block parties weekly. The plaza is slated to undergo a major renovation in 2026.

The plaza has the nation's largest mural of a skateboard, measuring 126 feet long and 34 feet wide. The mural was created by artist Matt French and a team of volunteers using donated paint.

==== Hawthorne Plaza ====
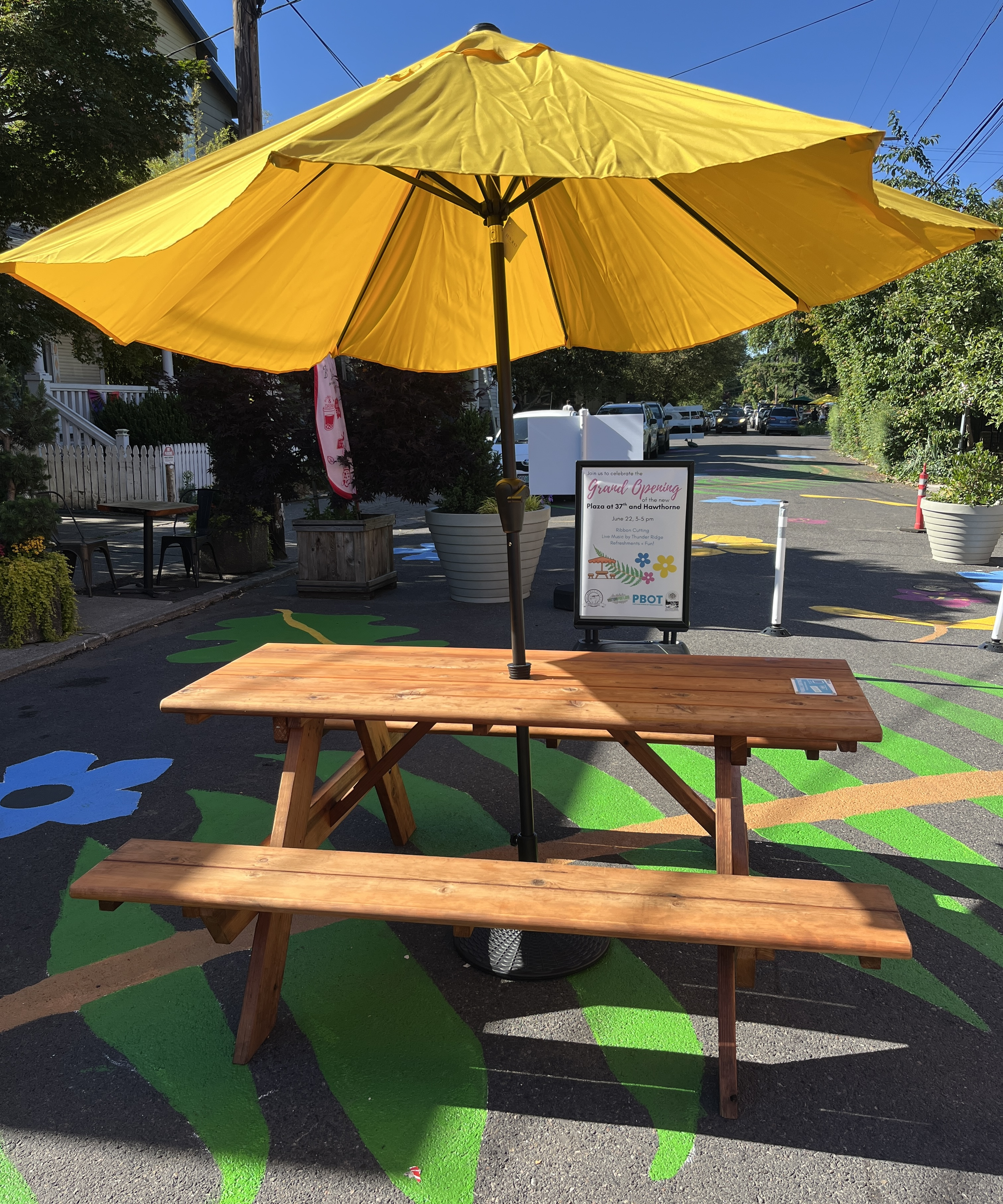
Hawthorne Plaza, 2025

Hawthorne Plaza is at the intersection of Hawthorne Boulevard and 37th Avenue. It opened in June 2025. The space has greenery, lighting, picnic tables, public art, and a solar kiosk to allow phone charging. The project was supported by PBOT, the Hawthorne Boulevard Business Association, and the Sunnyside Neighborhood Association. Venture Portland contributed $46,000. Plans for the plaza started in August 2024. Kami Gould painted a large mural of flowers and foliage called In Bloom to commemorate the "evolving spirit" of the community.

==== Montavilla Plaza ====
Montavilla Plaza is at the intersection of 79th Avenue and Stark Street. It was created in 2021, in collaboration with the Montavilla East Tabor Business Association. In 2023, the plaza hosted a makers' market and it was repainted with geographic details. In 2024, Montavilla Plaza hosted Montavilla Farmers Market's Berry Bash Summer Celebration featuring berry recipe tastings and a beer garden. The plaza was also among a dozen performance sites for the eleventh annual Montavilla Jazz Festival.

In 2025, the second annual hot dog cookoff called "Hop Dogs" was held at Montavilla Plaza. The competition sees local brewers create custom hot dogs with creative toppings. The site hosted performances in conjunction with the Montavilla Jazz Festival again in 2025. In November 2025, an art display of a streetcar was installed in the plaza as part of the business association's Meet Me in Montavilla program.

The plaza has also hosted holiday trees and lighting ceremonies.

=== Southwest Portland ===
Darcelle XV Promenade, October 2026

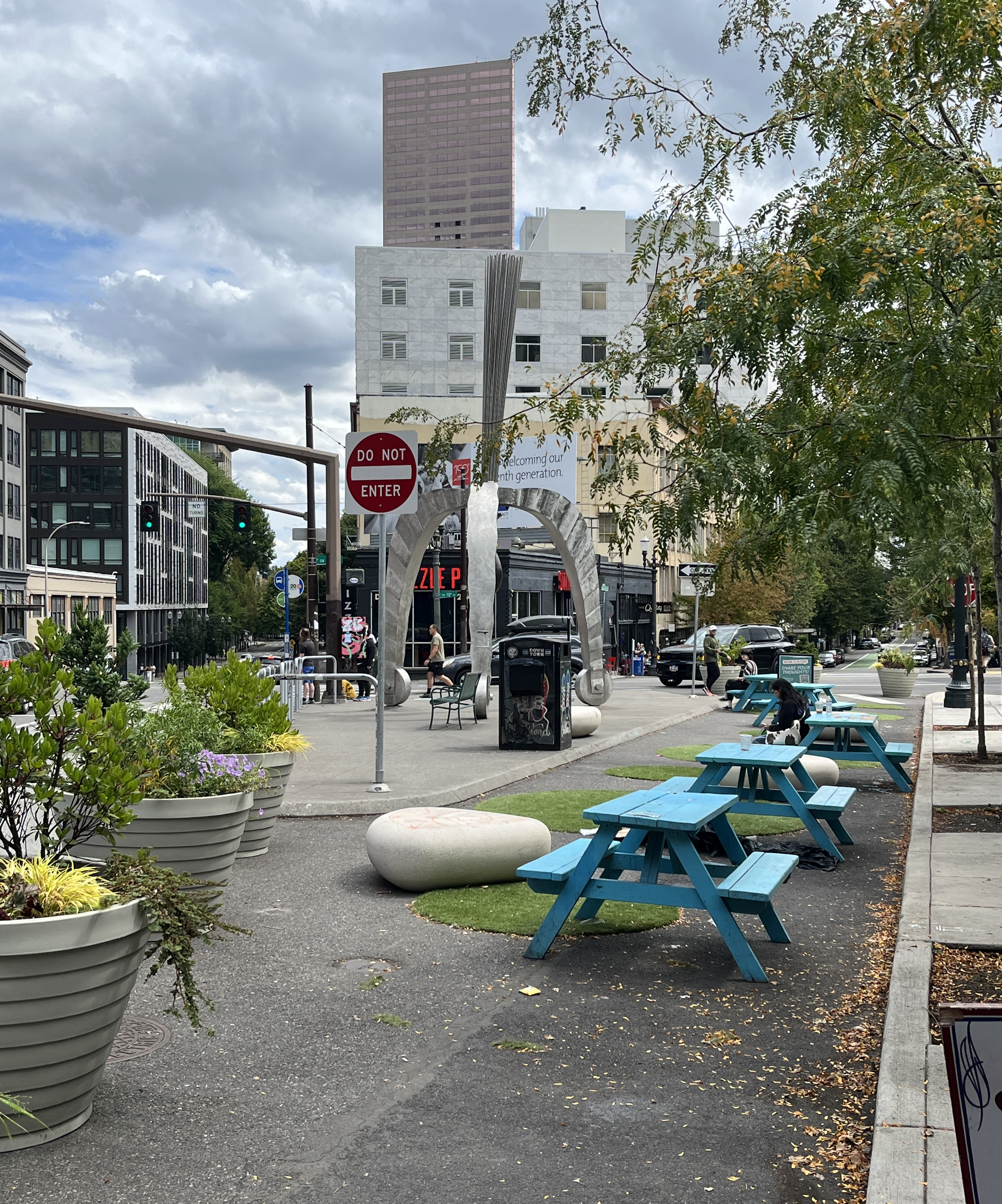
Pod Plaza, 2025

Plazas in southwest Portland include Ankeny Alley, the Cart Blocks (Park Avenue between Burnside and Oak Streets), Cultural District Plaza, Darcelle XV Promenade, Main Street Plaza, Montgomery Street Plaza, Pod Plaza, Pride Plaza, and the Yamhill District Plazas.

Darcelle XV Promenade is on 9th Avenue between Harvey Milk Street and Washington Street, next to Darcelle XV Plaza. Darcelle XV Promenade includes part of the Green Loop and has artwork, furnishings, and lighting.

Pod Plaza is on 10th Avenue at Burnside Street. In 2024, the plaza hosted a custom poems pop-up and temporarily housed Victoria Smith's sculpture Thrive. Don't Just Survive. as part of art trail Coraline's Curious Cat Trail. The plaza has an orientation sign, as of 2026.

The Yamhill District Plazas are on Yamhill Street between First and Third Avenues.

==== Ankeny Alley ====
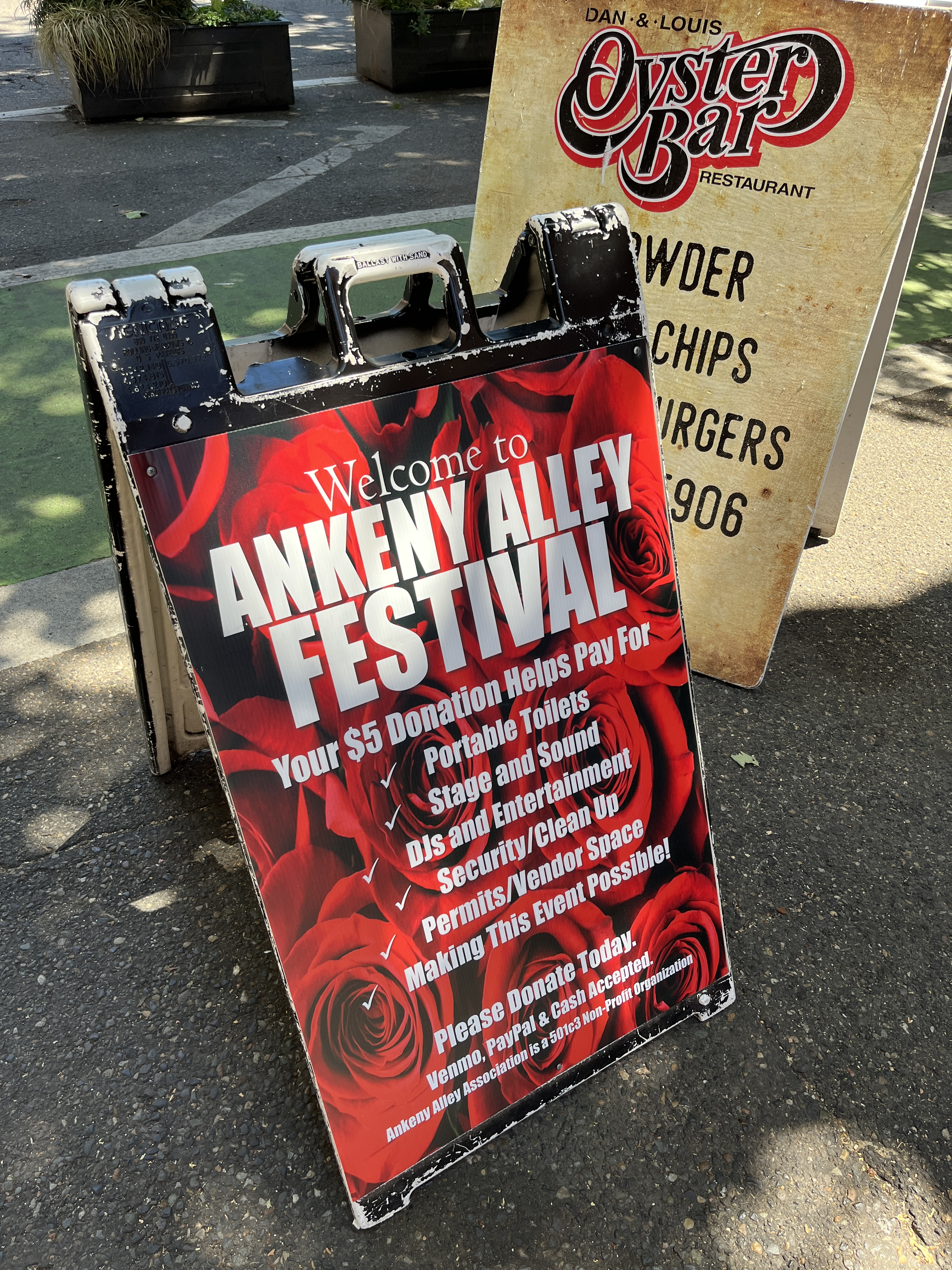
Sign for the Ankeny Alley Festival, 2023

Ankeny Alley is on Ankeny Street between Second and Third Avenues. The plaza had a promenade for biking, as of 2016.

In 2023, Oregon Public Broadcasting described the Ankeny Alley Festival as a series of events "organized to rally support for businesses in the neighborhood that have faced declines in revenue as visits from Portlanders and tourists alike have diminished in recent years". The series included a Pride party and a Labor Day celebration with art, food, live entertainment, and music. 25 businesses supported the series launch in 2023. Red roses were painted along the walkway by Baes Fried Chicken employee Erica Litzner and her son. In 2023, a lūʻau-themed party as part of the Ankeny Alley Festival was turned into a fundraiser organized by a group of local Hawaiian businesses to benefit victims of the Hawaii wildfires. The event featured entertainment, food, and Hawaiian music.

Ankeny Alley hosted a celebration for the local holiday 503 Day in 2026. Organized by the Ankeny Alley Business Association, the event was attended by Maxine Dexter, mayor Keith Wilson and multiple members of Portland City Council, as well as musician Toody Cole of the band Dead Moon. The celebration also marked the launch of Ankeny Alley as the "Pink Light District". In July 2026, Ankeny Alley hosted block parties in conjunction with the city's annual Pride celebrations.

==== Cultural District Plaza ====
Cultural District Plaza is on Madison Street and Park Avenue, outside the Portland Art Museum (PAM) and along the South Park Blocks. In 2026, a "community painting party" was held, inviting 500 people to paint a mural designed by Yinka Ilori called Mountains Full of Blessings. The official opening featured performances and free admission to PAM.

==== Main Street Plaza ====
Main Street Plaza (or SW Main Street Plaza) is on Main Street between Park Avenue and Broadway. The plaza has hosted singers, dancing, and music. In 2025, the plaza hosted Broadway and musical performances by the Metropolitan Youth Symphony and the theatre company Stumptown Stages. Main Street Plaza was along the Sunday Parkways route in 2026.

==== Montgomery Street Plaza ====
Montgomery Street Plaza (or SW Montgomery Street Plaza) is on Montgomery Street between Broadway and Sixth Avenue. Vehicle traffic was removed in 2019. In 2022, the plaza was a gathering point for the Illuminated Bike Ride, as part of the Portland Winter Light Festival (PWLF). The plaza has also hosted concerts and served as a gathering site for a community service event for Portland State University students.

==== Pride Plaza ====
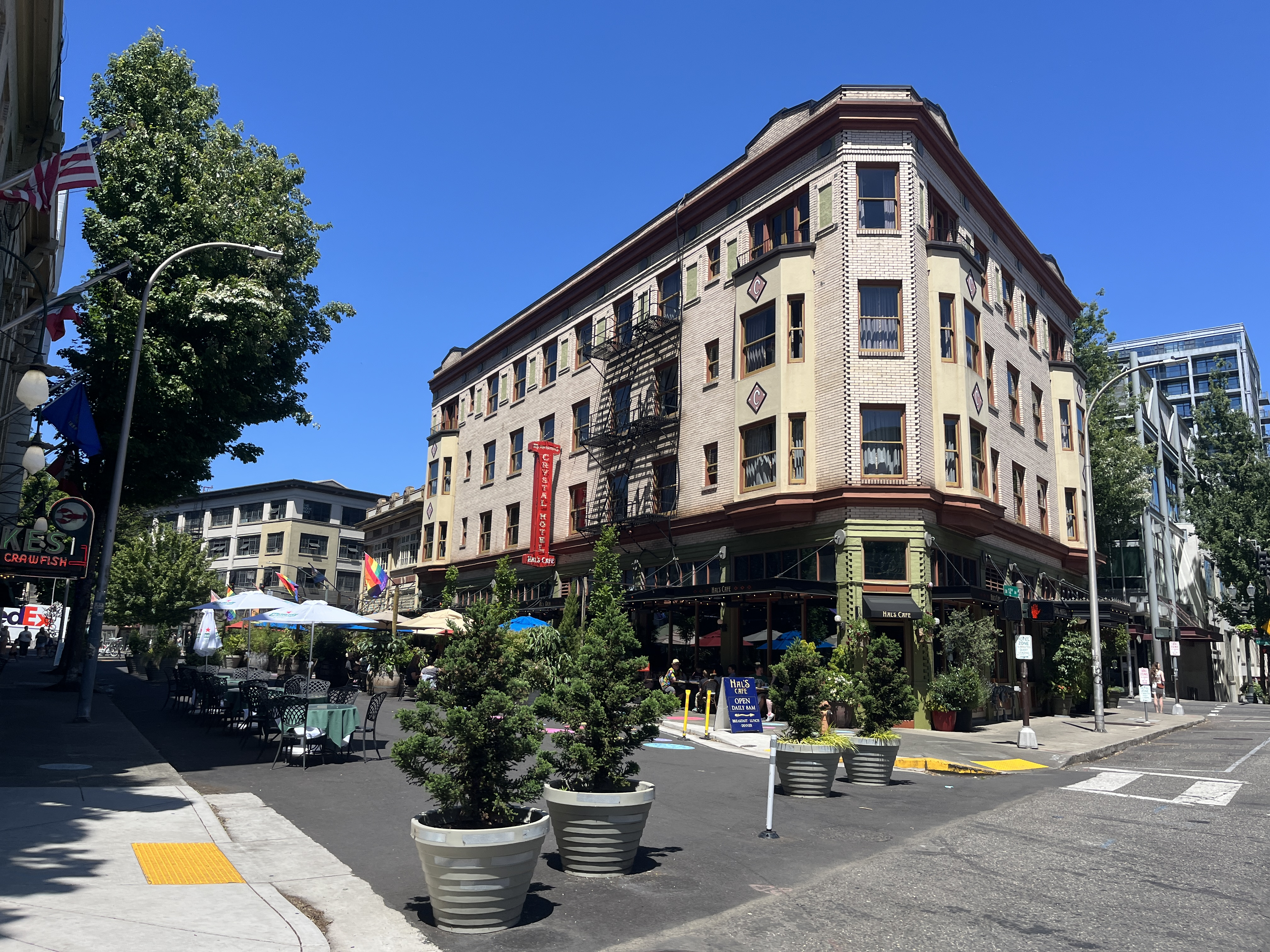
Pride Plaza in 2026

Pride Plaza is located on Harvey Milk Street, between Burnside Street and 12th Avenue, along a portion of Stark Street commemorating LGBTQ rights activist Harvey Milk. Pride Plaza was designed "to be a 'safe space' for community gatherings, commerce and public art during the pandemic", according to KOIN. Hardesty met with PBOT officials at Pride Plaza in 2022 to discuss making the Healthy Businesses and Portland Public Street Plaza programs permanent.

The event "Pride on the Plaza" was held at the plaza in 2022 in conjunction with Pride celebrations. In 2023, a rainbow-themed street painting extending to the People's Bike Library of Portland was added to commemorate the street's LGBTQ history. In 2024, Nautilus Deep Sea by Heather Dawn Sparks and Sparks Designs was installed in the plaza after being displayed near Salmon Street Springs at Tom McCall Waterfront Park during the PWLF. The work was moved to Pride Plaza with funding from the Portland Environment Management Office and PBOT.

The car-free plaza underwent improvements in 2026. Planters, seating, and street art were added. A reopening ceremony was held on October 3, featuring disc jockeys, Poison Waters and other drag performers, and LGBTQ-owned vendors.
