= Alder Street food cart pod =

Former collection of food carts in Portland, Oregon, US

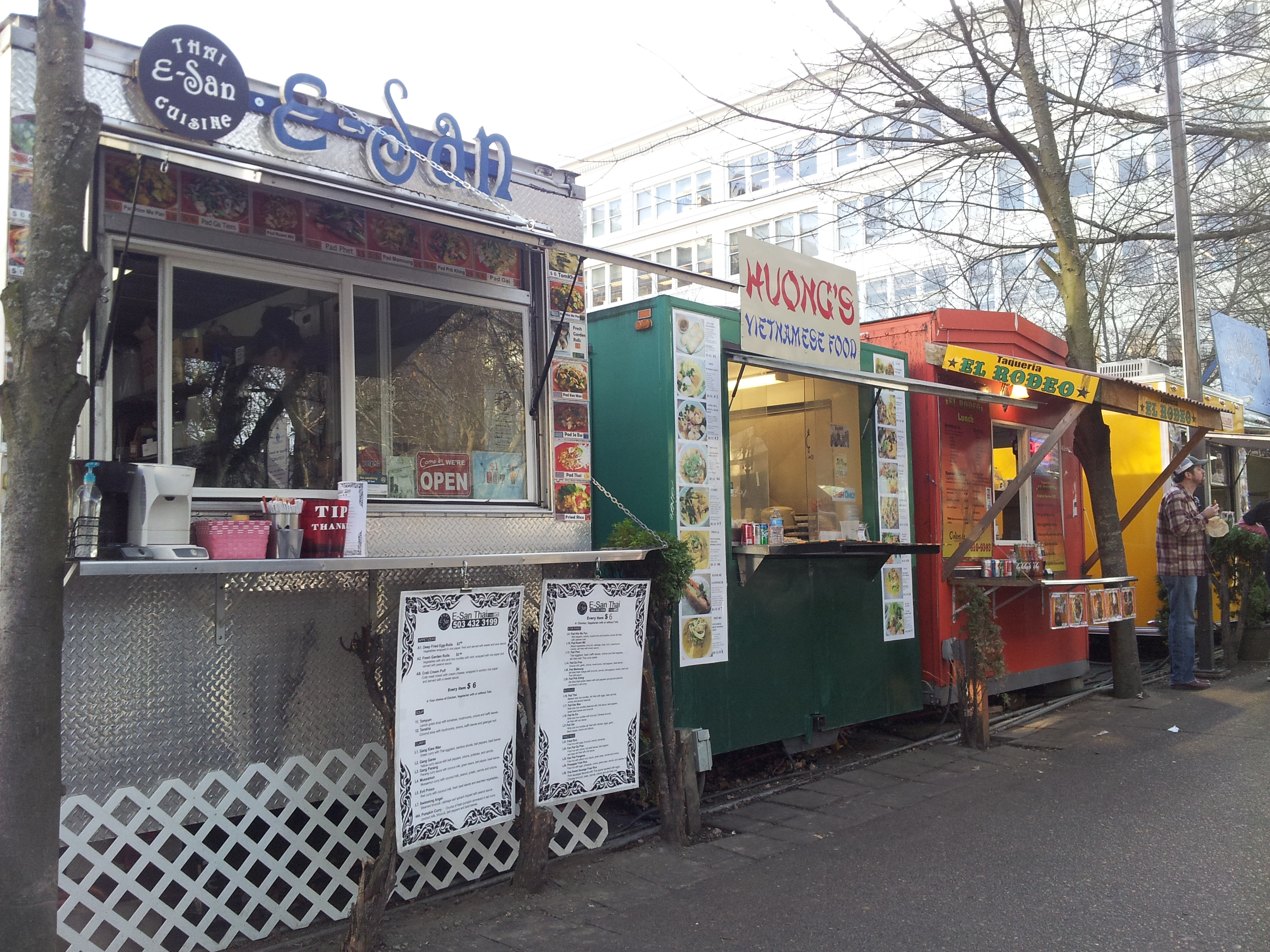
- An E-san Thai Cuisine food cart and others at the pod in 2013
- Location: Portland, Oregon, U.S.
- Location within Portland, Oregon
- Coordinates: 45°31′15.6″N 122°40′53.2″W

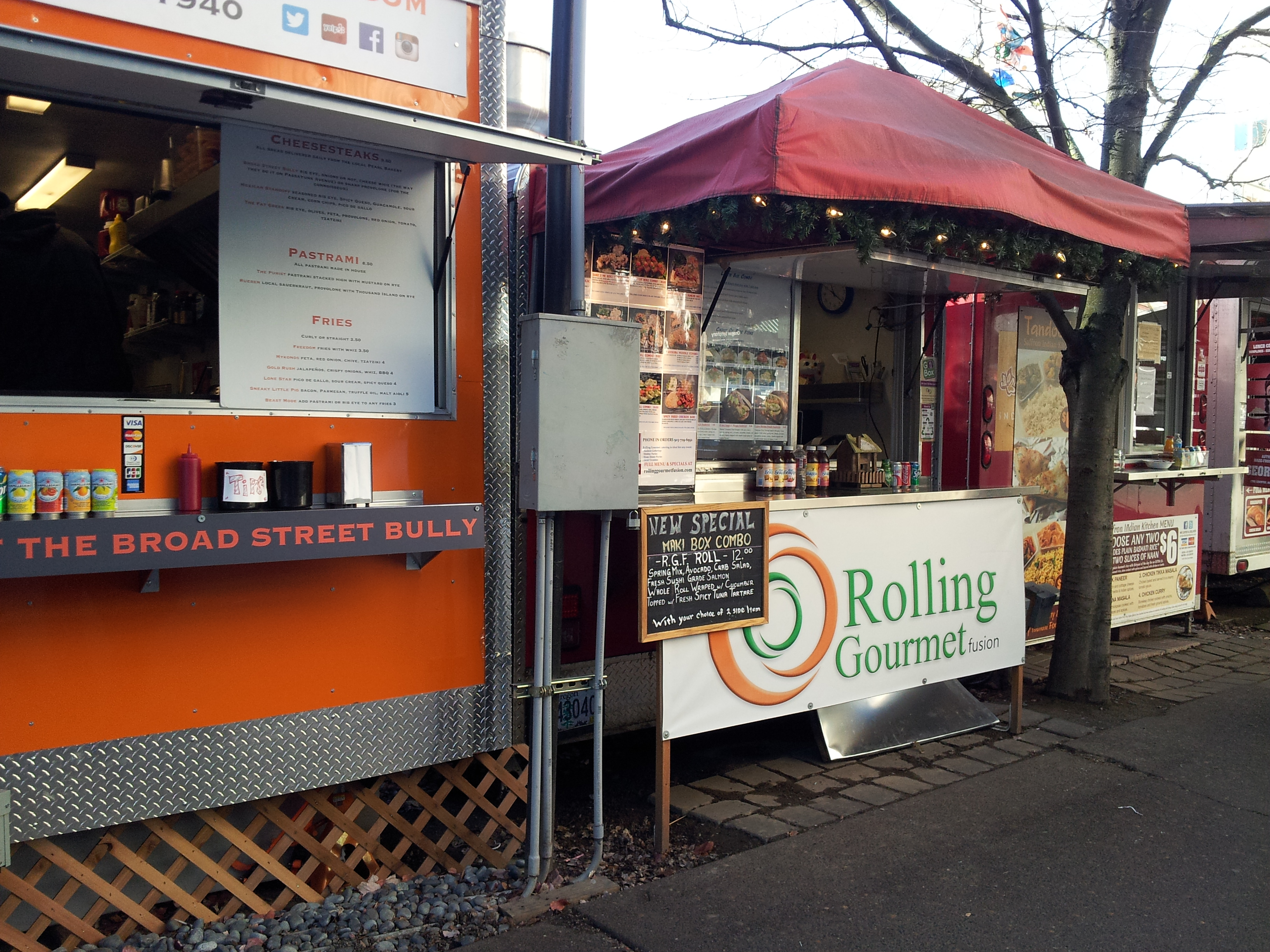
Some of the pod's food carts, 2013

The Alder Street food cart pod was a pod of food carts at the intersection of Southwest 10th Avenue and Alder Street in Portland, Oregon, United States.

== Description and history ==
Established during the 1990s, the popular pod hosted approximately 60 carts at its peak. According to The Columbian, "The Alder Street food cart pod in downtown Portland over the years grew into a central piece of the region's culture." In 2008, the pod appeared on the thirteenth season of The Amazing Race.

The pod was the city's largest, before closing in 2019 for construction of Block 216. In late 2019, Eater Portland's Brooke Jackson-Glidden wrote, "Earlier this year, the loss of one of Portland’s most notable food cart pods struck fear into the hearts of many local diners: The closure of the Alder Street food carts was seen as the potential death rattle of the city’s larger street food scene." Some of the carts relocated to Ankeny Square, a section of the North Park Blocks south of Burnside Street. The food pod Cart Blocks opened in Ankeny Square in 2021.

The People's Pig operated at the pod. Bing Mi and Shanghai's Best also operated at the site.

== See also ==
- Food carts in Portland, Oregon
