= Ankeny Square =

Public park in Portland, Oregon, U.S.

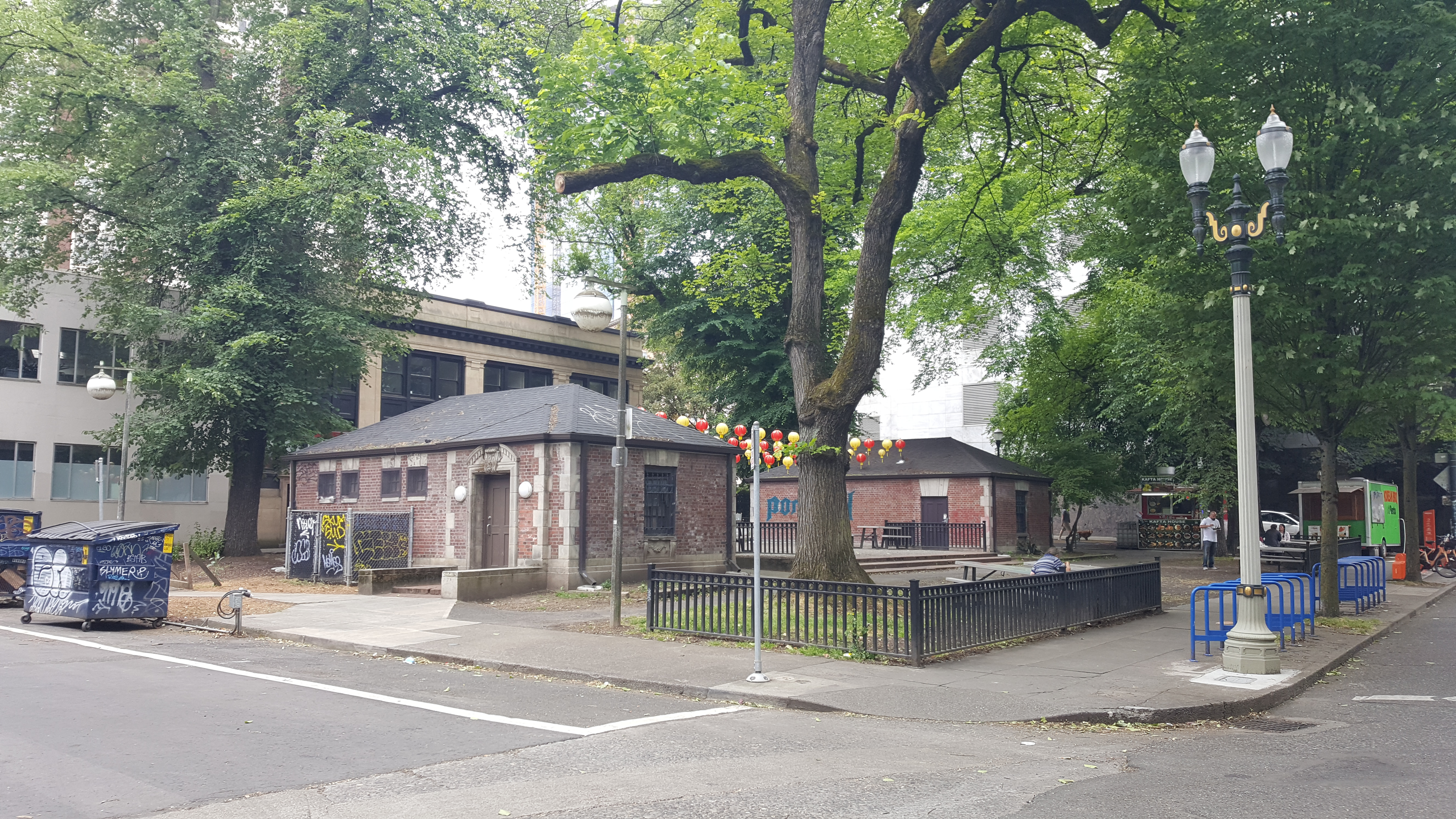
- Ankeny Square in 2022

- Location within Portland, Oregon
- Interactive map of Ankeny Square
- Location: Portland, Oregon, U.S.
- Coordinates: 45°31′22″N 122°40′43″W

Ankeny Square is part of the North Park Blocks in Portland, Oregon. The square is south of Burnside Street. One local reporter described it as "a little nub of SW Ankeny Street between Broadway and Park".

In 2014, the square was home to a food cart pod called "Grubbin'". The pod emerged from plans by Portland Parks & Recreation (PPR) to revitalize the square. In 2016, Amanda Waldroupe of Street Roots said the park, "for decades, has had a seedy reputation and attracted drug use, loitering and vandalism, as it fell into neglect and disrepair". PPR also announced plans to start accepting business proposals, and proposals for community projects. The square began hosting the Cart Blocks in 2021, following closure of the Alder Street food cart pod.
