= Blumenauer Bridge =

Bicycle and pedestrian bridge in Portland, Oregon, U.S.

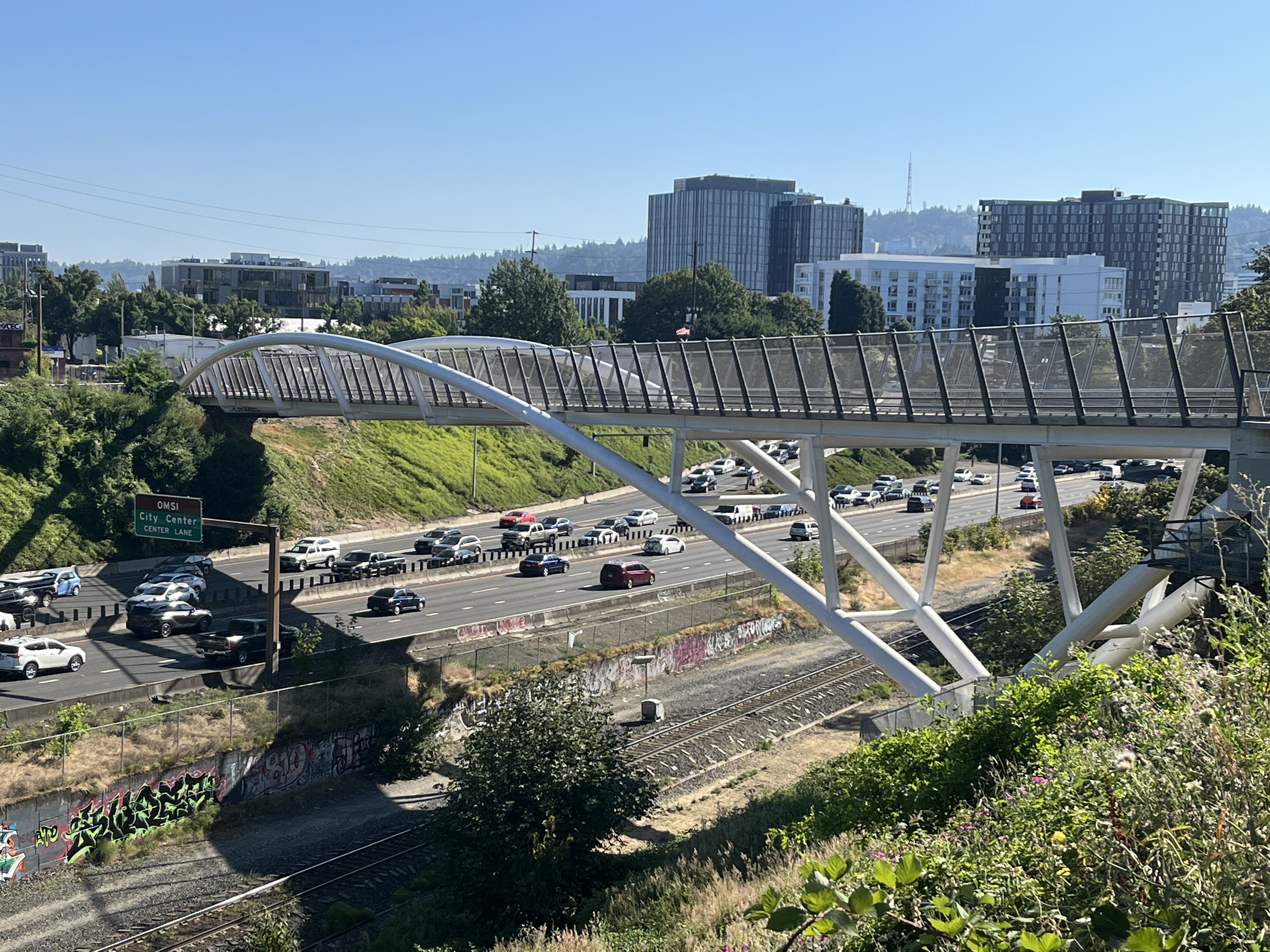
- The bridge in August 2022
- Coordinates: 45°31′35.5″N 122°39′31.4″W
- Locale: Portland, Oregon, U.S.
- Other name: Sullivan's Crossing
- Named for: Earl Blumenauer

Characteristics
- Design: tied arch
- Total length: 475 feet (145 m)
- Width: 24 feet (7.3 m)

History
- Construction cost: $19 million
- Opened: July 31, 2022

Location
- Interactive map of Blumenauer Bridge

The Blumenauer Bridge, formally the Congressman Earl Blumenauer Bicycle and Pedestrian Bridge, and previously known as Sullivan's Crossing, is a bicycle and pedestrian bridge in Portland, Oregon. United States. The $19 million project spans Interstate 84 and connects the Lloyd District with Kerns in inner northeast Portland. The bridge was originally slated to open in December 2020, but its projected opening was later postponed to the following spring and subsequently to July 31, 2022, and the bridge did open on that date.

The bridge uses a tied-arch design and is 475 feet (145 m) long and 24 feet (7.3 m) wide.

Completion of the bridge marks the first portion of the Green Loop to be finished.

== See also ==
- Bicycle bridge
- Sullivan's Gulch, Portland, Oregon
