= The People's Pig =

Barbecue restaurant in Portland, Oregon, U.S.

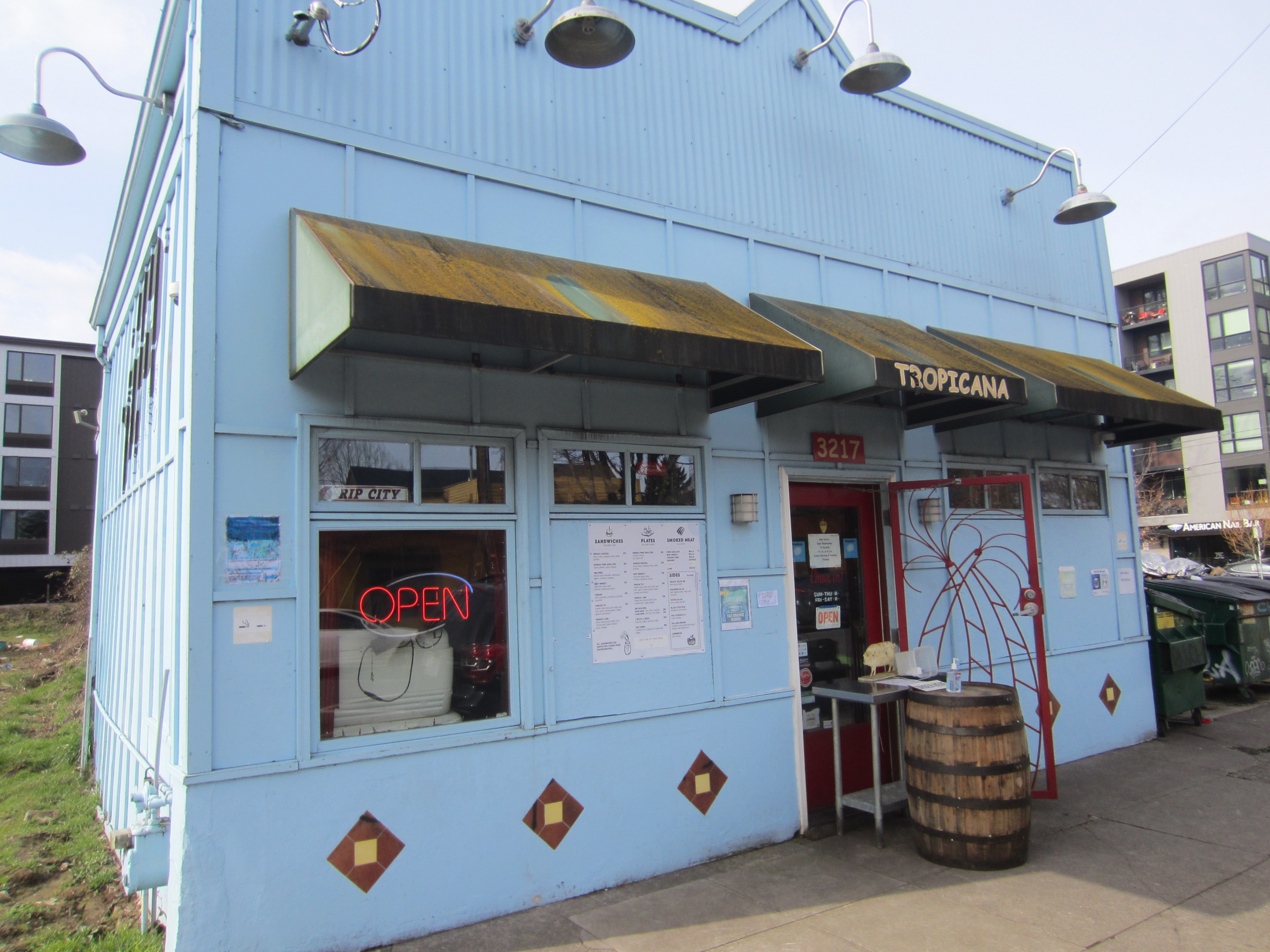
- Exterior of the restaurant on North Williams Avenue in 2021
- Interactive map of The People's Pig

Restaurant information
- Owner: Cliff Allen
- Chef: Morgan Brownlow
- Food type: Barbecue
- Location: 3217 North Williams Avenue, Portland, Multnomah, Oregon, 97227, United States
- Coordinates: 45.5464°N 122.6669°W

The People's Pig is a barbecue restaurant in Portland, Oregon, United States. Cliff Allen started the business as a food cart in 2009, before opening a brick and mortar location on Williams Avenue in the north Portland part of the Eliot neighborhood in 2014. A second brick and mortar location began operating in January 2018, but closed permanently by 2020.

== Description ==
The barbecue restaurant The People's Pig has served brisket, fried chicken, pork shoulder, and St. Louis-style ribs as plates or sandwiches. Sides include beans, collards, coleslaw, cornbread, French fries, macaroni salad, and potato salad. The porchetta sandwich has roast pork loin, pork belly, and a rub with fennel and garlic. Time Out Portland has said the restaurant is "perennially packed with pork-lovers who seek out various preparations of expertly smoked cuts".

The restaurant's logo, which depicts a pig, is painted in black and blue on the side of the location of the brick and mortar space on Williams Avenue, in the north Portland part of the Eliot neighborhood.

== History ==
Owner Cliff Allen started the business as a food cart in 2009. As of 2010, The People's Pig operated at the intersection of Southwest 2nd Avenue and Stark Street in downtown Portland, serving seven sandwiches with pork on ciabatta. The options were coppa, porchetta, sopressata, toscana, and three pulled pork varieties.

Allen opened the Eliot restaurant in August 2014, in the space that previously housed Tropicana BBQ. He also kept the food cart operating at the Alder Street food cart pod at the intersection of 10th Avenue and Washington in downtown Portland. Morgan Brownlow was the chef at the Eliot location.

In September 2017, the business announced plans to open another location on East Burnside Street in October. Following a delay, the location opened in January 2018. The 40-seat outpost was short-lived. In November 2019, Flying Fish Company announced plans to move into the space. Flying Fish opened in February 2020.

In May 2020, the Eliot location was vandalized and spray painted with a "veganarchy" symbol.

== Reception ==
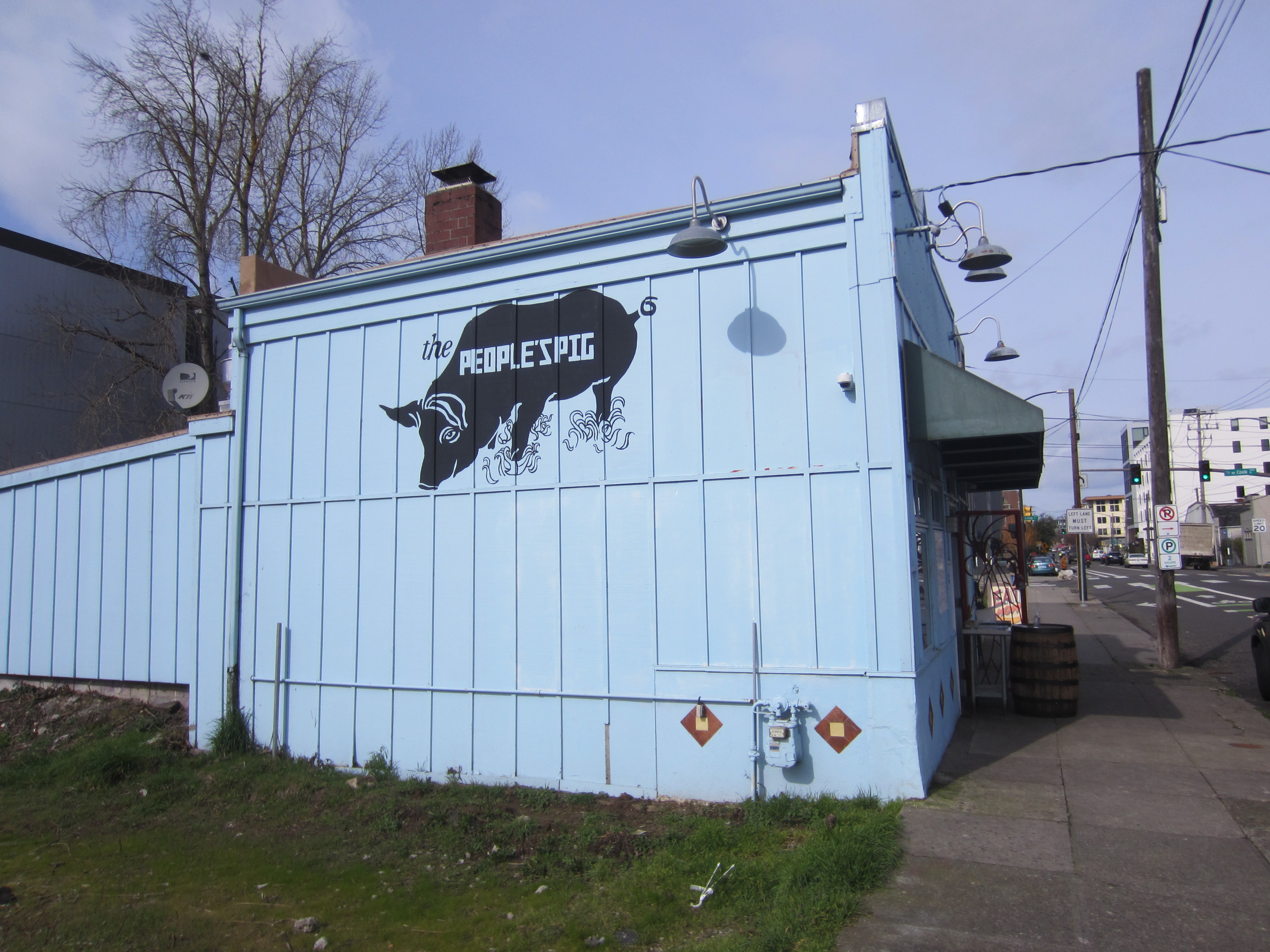
The restaurant's logo on the side of the North Williams Avenue location, 2021

In Food Lovers' Guide to Portland, Oregon (2014), Laurie Wolf wrote: "Pork belly, porchetta sandwiches, ciabatta bread ... heaven". In Insiders' Guide to Portland, Oregon (2014) Rachel Dresbeck said The People's Pig's "amazingly savory" sandwiches "might be the very best in Portland".

Karen Brooks of Portland Monthly said The People's Pig offered Portland's best new barbecue in 2015. In a 2015 review of the Eliot restaurant, Michael Russell of The Oregonian wrote, "The People's Pig ... might not be a traditional barbecue spot -- there's no Texas-style brisket, no North Carolina-style pulled pork -- but for the last year their best dish (the gorgeous sliced pork shoulder) has been my favorite smoked meat in Portland. Almost as good is the fried chicken sandwich, with its bacon-like smokiness, a contender for Portland's sandwich of the year."

Time Out Portland said in 2016, "[The restaurant's] sandwiches, served on excellent sourdough rolls, are fantastic: our favorite features those juicy slices of pork shoulder, stacked with braised greens and shot through with spicy vinegar." In Willamette Week's 2017 overview of recommended eateries in north Portland, Matthew Korfhage said the fried chicken was "wonderful" and recommended the potato salad. The People's Pig ranked third in the Best Barbecue category of the newspaper's annual Best of Portland readers' poll in 2018.

== See also ==
- List of barbecue restaurants
