= Arleta Triangle =

Pocket park in Portland, Oregon, U.S.

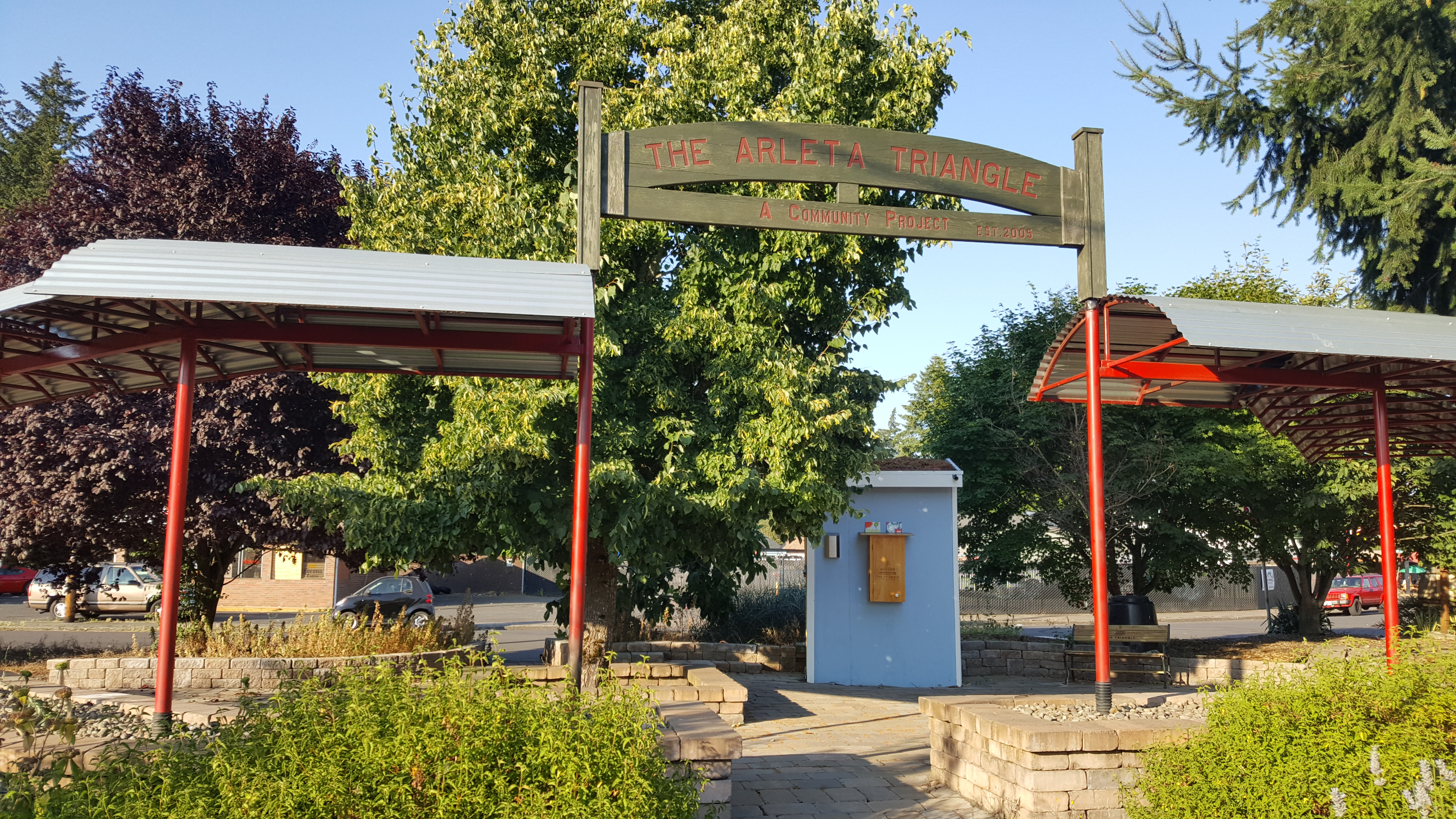
- Structure with architectural walls and canopies, 2020

- Location within Portland, Oregon
- Interactive map of Arleta Triangle
- Type: Pocket park
- Location: Portland, Oregon, U.S.
- Coordinates: 45.4797°N 122.5891°W

Arleta Triangle is a traffic island and pocket park in Portland, Oregon's Mt. Scott-Arleta neighborhood, in the United States. Rebecca Ellis of Oregon Public Broadcasting has described the space as a "formerly shopping-cart littered traffic island turned pocket park".

== Description and history ==
Arleta Triangle is a small triangular traffic island and pocket park at the intersection of Southeast 72nd Avenue and Woodstock Boulevard in southeast Portland's Mt. Scott-Arleta neighborhood. Formerly the site of a trolley stop, the island had devolved into "a patch of dirt, and a lone tree standing in the middle", according to neighborhood association volunteer Meghan Humphreys.

In 2005, she and other neighbors established the Arleta Triangle Project to create a community space. They had three goals: safety and ensuring people entering the neighborhood from the south had access to the community center; "creating positive neighborhood identity; and "community building and creating pride in this revitalizing neighborhood".

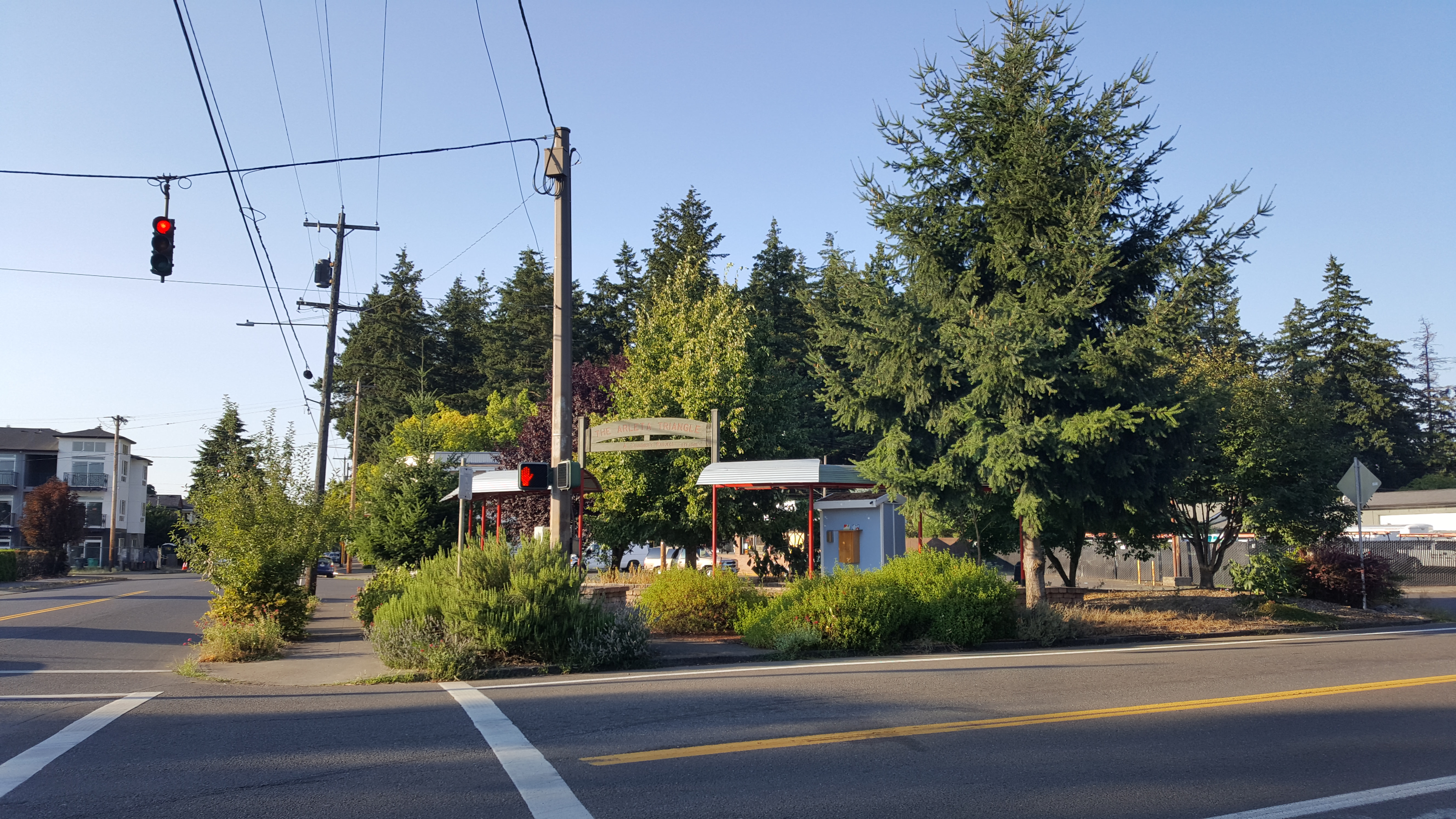
The island in July 2020

A group of volunteers rebuilt the island's architectural walls on August 29, 2015, replacing cob with materials requiring less maintenance, including stacked engineered stone. One of the walls had been damaged by a vehicle; insurance from the driver provided part of the funding, and an additional $1,500 was donated from the neighborhood association. Volunteers meet at the island on the last Saturday of each month, as of 2015.

Volunteers have also built a canopy over the structure; construction was overseen by artist Brian Borrello. Some funding for the canopy was provided by the Regional Arts & Culture Council. In addition to Humphreys, other Arleta Triangle Project volunteers include Scott Bala, Jerry Harmon, and Sarah Iannrone.

For the space's tenth anniversary, a student at Portland State University's Community Design Studio helped create a new brand for the triangle, including a logo, signage, and online footprint. The purpose was to "create a stronger identity for the space and help project leaders conduct expanded outreach and gain momentum for ongoing work and improvements over the next decade".

== See also ==
- Street plazas in Portland, Oregon
