= E-san Thai Cuisine =

Thai restaurant chain based in Portland, Oregon, U.S.

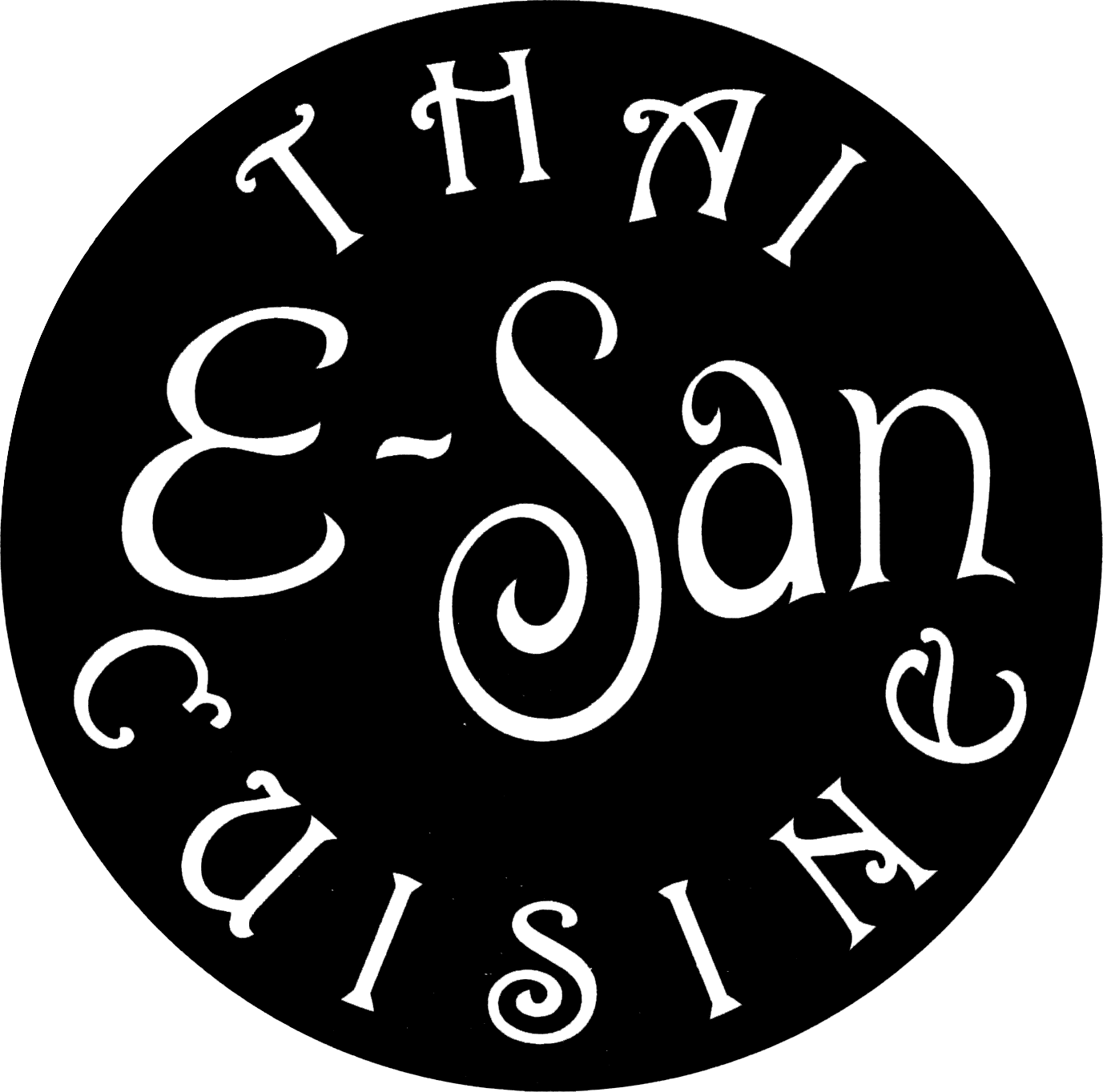

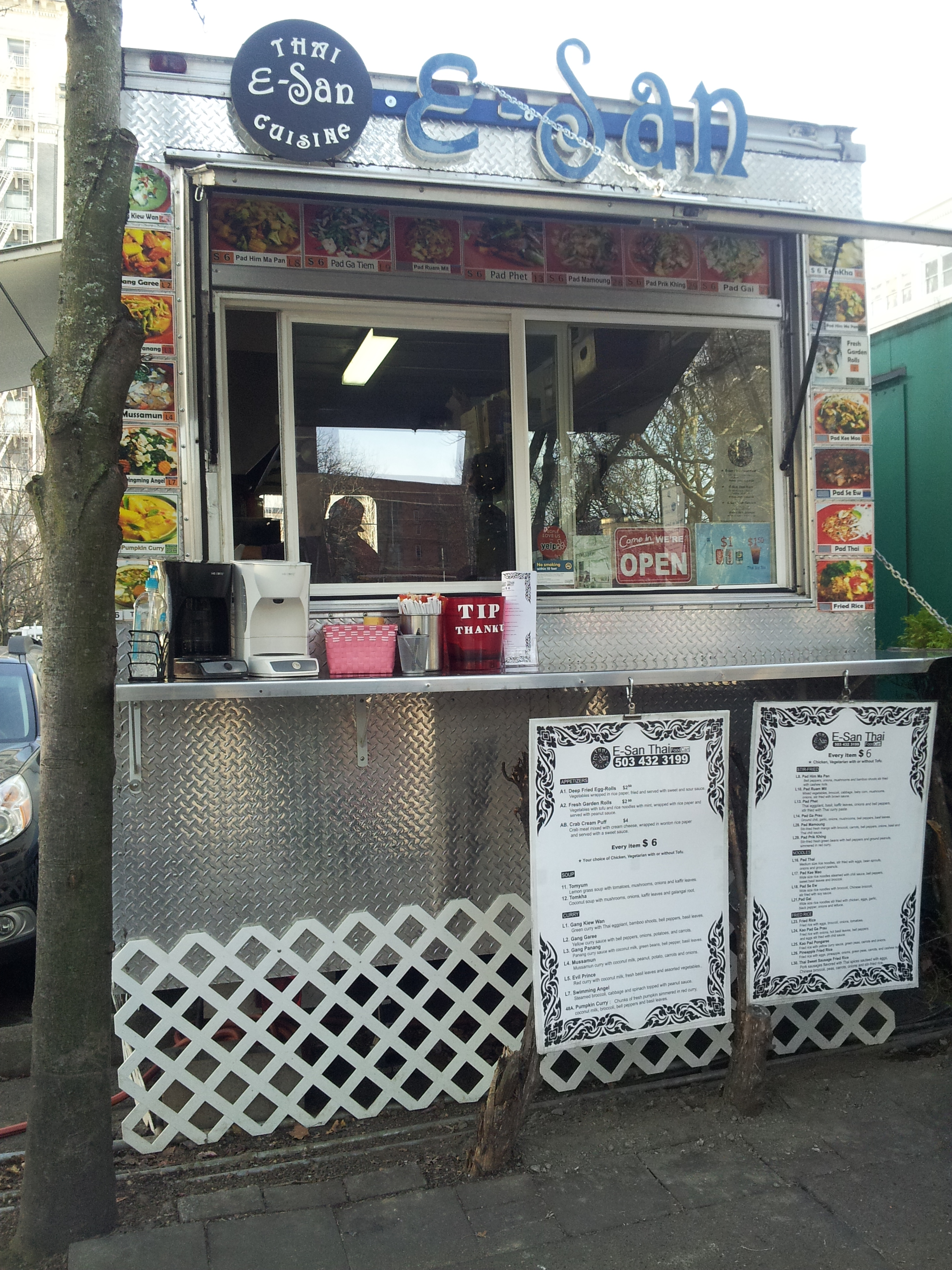
- E-san Thai at the Alder Street food cart pod in 2013

Restaurant information
- Food type: Thai
- Location: United States

E-san Thai Cuisine is a Thai restaurant with multiple locations in the Portland metropolitan area, in the United States.

== History and locations ==
There was a stationary food cart in Vancouver, Washington, as of 2015. The Vancouver had 36 food options with beef, chicken, pork, or tofu. The menu included Pad See Ew, Gang Garee, and Pad Kee Mao. The food pod in Happy Valley, Oregon was slated to have an E-san cart, as of 2015.

There was also a food cart at the Tidbit Food Farm and Garden food pod at the intersection of Southeast 28th Avenue and Division Street. The pod opened in 2014 closed in 2017. BG's Food Cartel at The Round, a food pod in Beaverton, Oregon, had two E-San carts, as of 2018.

The restaurant in downtown Portland's Haseltine Building closed in January 2021, during the COVID-19 pandemic. The restaurant's January 9 announcement read, "We want to thank our past crew members and especially our loyal customers for supporting E-San in our 22 years of being open. We are devastated to see it go, but also extremely grateful for the connections and experiences it has brought us as a family business."

The restaurant participated in Portland's Dumpling Week in 2026.

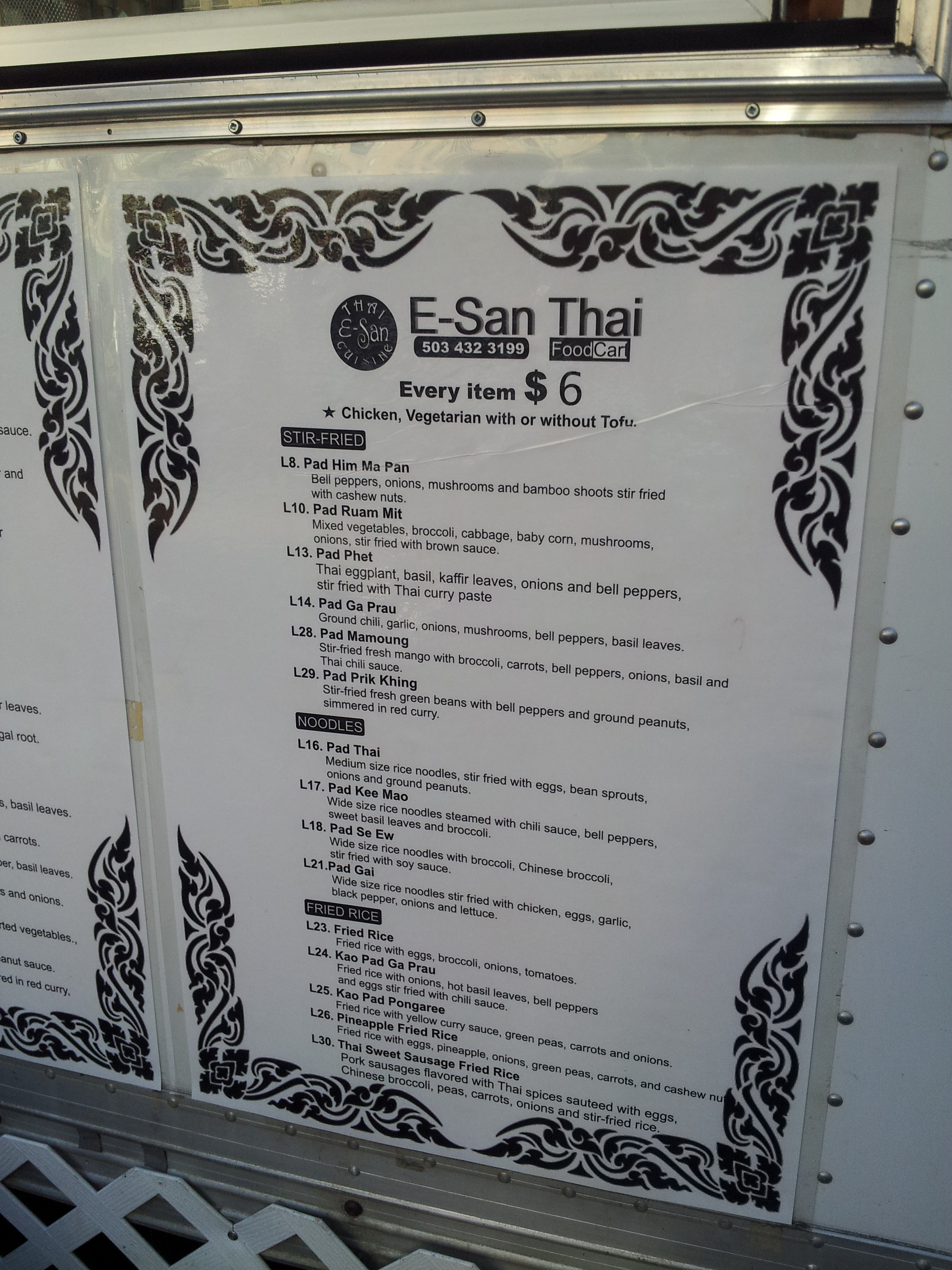
Menu at the Alder Street food cart pod, 2013

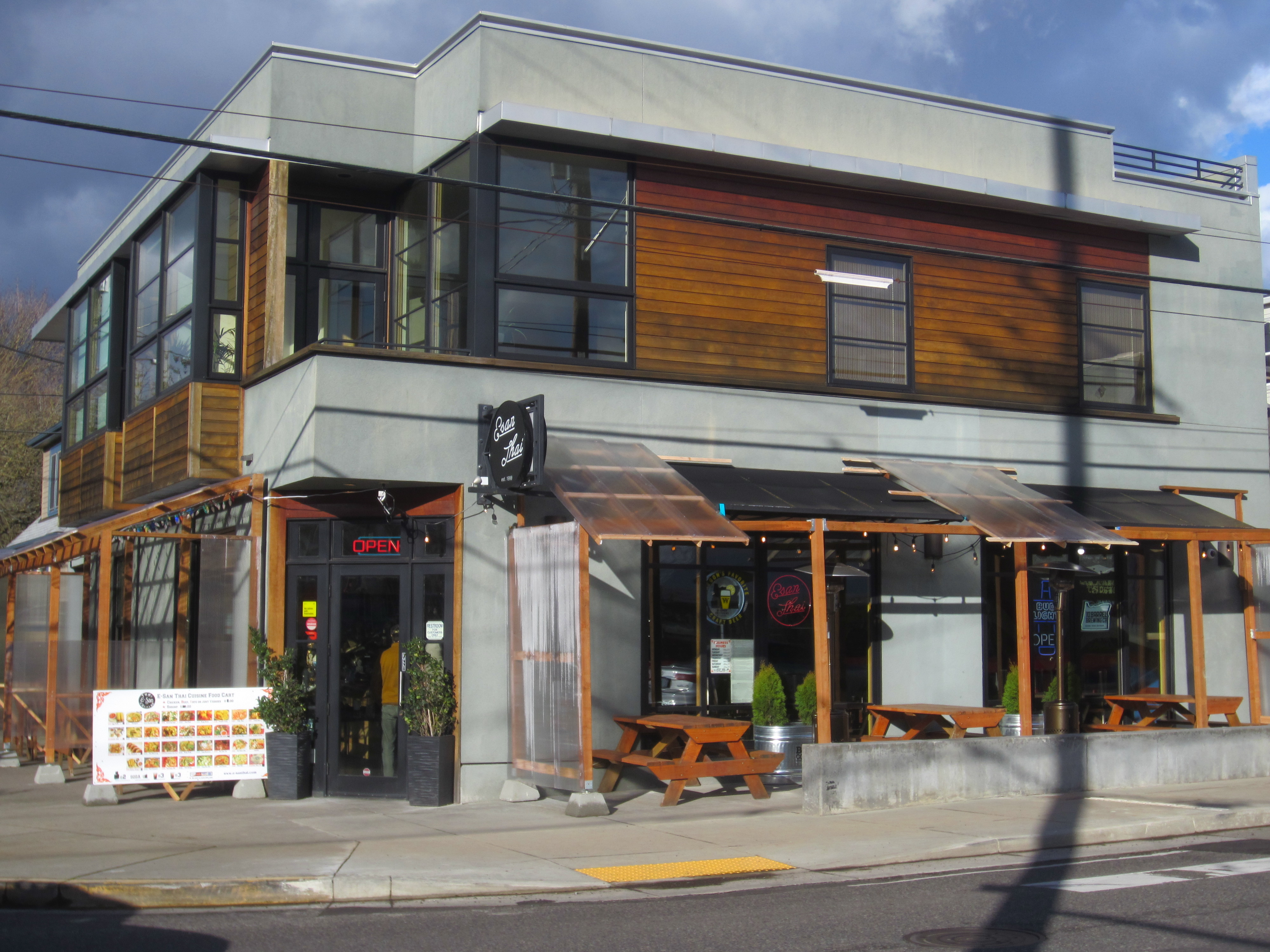
Southeast Portland restaurant, 2021

== Reception ==
In 2016 and 2017, E-san was a runner-up in the Best Pad Thai category in Willamette Week's annual readers' poll.

== See also ==
- List of restaurant chains in the United States
- List of Thai restaurants
