= Cart Blocks =

Food cart pod in Portland, Oregon, U.S.

- Logo
- Location: Portland, Oregon, U.S.
- Location within Oregon Location within the United States
- Coordinates: 45°31′21.4″N 122°40′43″W

Cart Blocks is a food cart pod in Portland, Oregon's Ankeny Square, in the United States. It is operated by Friends of the Green Loop and has capacity for 24 to 26 carts.

== History ==
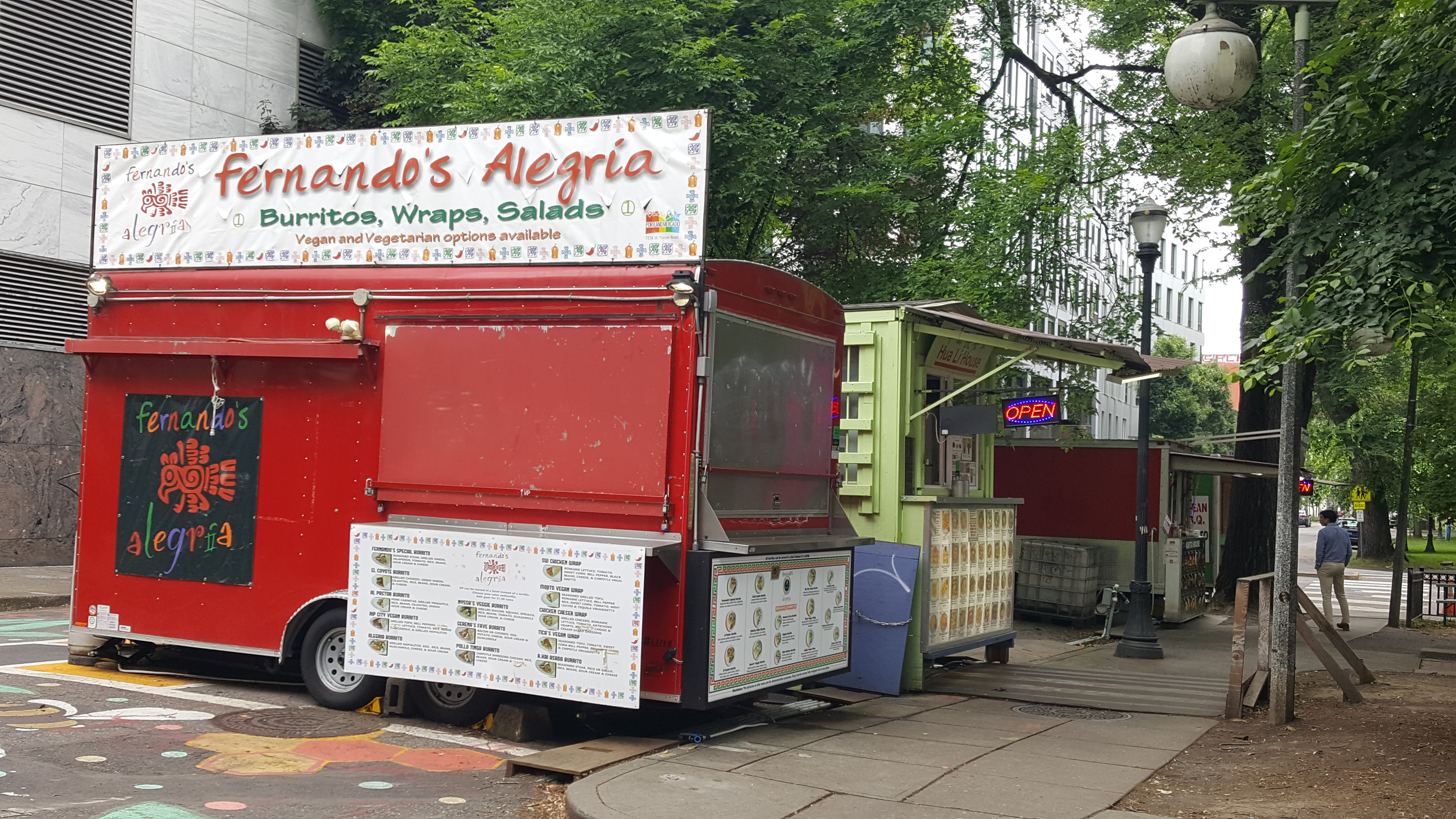
Food carts on the perimeter of Ankeny Square, 2022

The pod opened in 2021, following closure of the Alder Street food cart pod in 2019. Permitting for the pod took longer than expected. Some of the food carts that had been displaced by the closing and developing of the former location were temporarily housed at a nearby Post Office and eventually moved here to continue their businesses.

The pod is part of a vision to revitalize downtown Portland through building a “culinary corridor,” which would allow carts to occupy parking spaces across several North-South blocks stretching from Portland State University to NW Burnside Blvd as part of the Green Loop. Former mayor Ted Wheeler supported the Cart Blocks by setting aside financing for them in his budget recommendations for 2021 and a federal grant was obtained in 2022 to connect the Cart Blocks with Darcelle XV Plaza.

The city hosted a ribbon-cutting ceremony to commemorate the pod's opening. In December 2023, Portland signed a five-year deal to keep the pod open.

=== Events ===
The pod has hosted events. In 2023, the site hosted a floral installation, as well as a dance party and ice cream social following the Pride Bike Ride. In 2024, the Cart Blocks hosted another dance party for Pride and a Juneteenth market highlighting Black-owned businesses. In 2025, the pod hosted "illuminated" performances as part of an LED drag show.

== Businesses ==
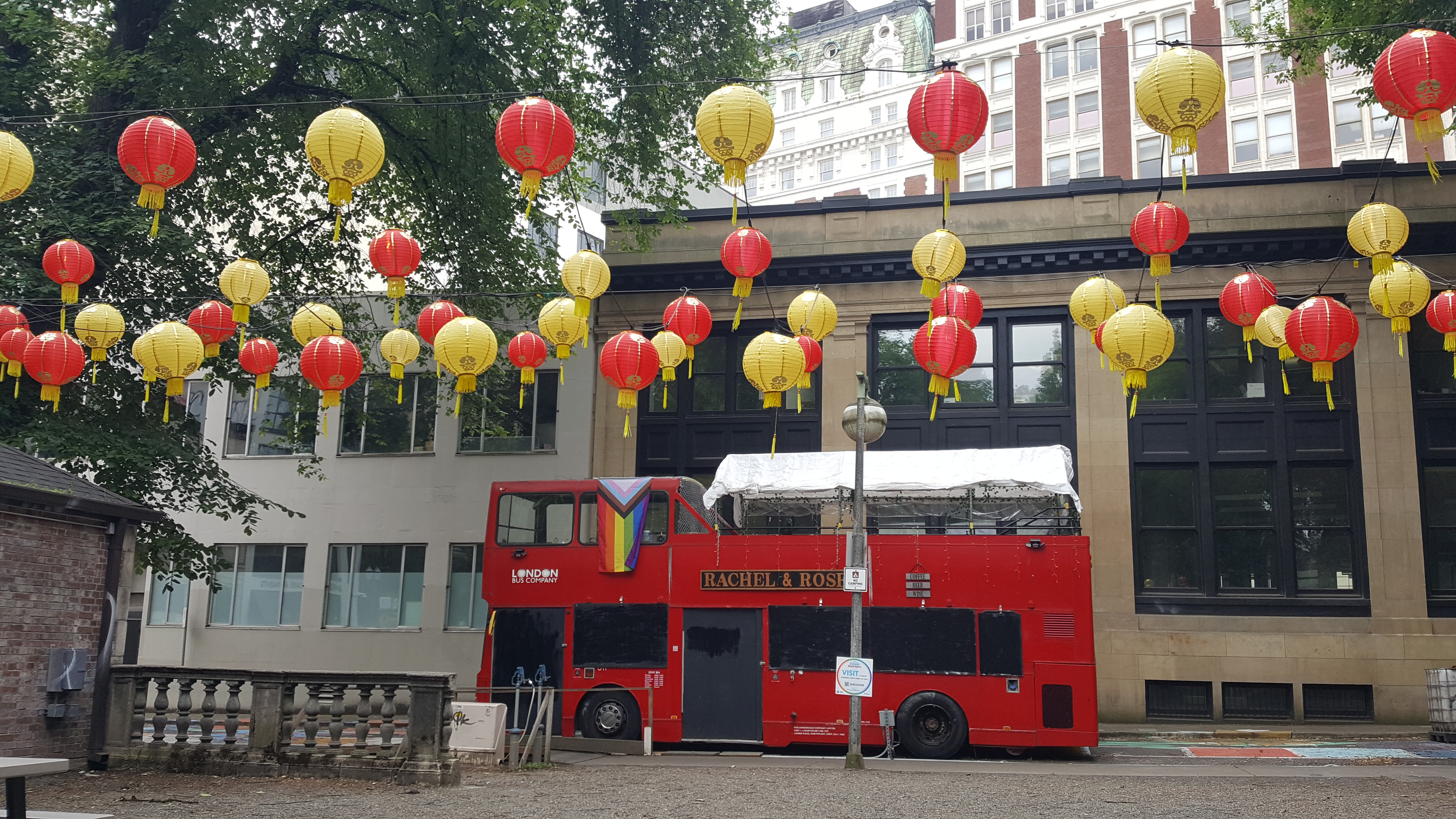
Rachel & Rose, 2022

Businesses that have operated at the site include:

- #1 Bento
- Anna Thai Basil
- Beijing House
- Cookie McCakeface
- Fernando's Alegria
- Hua Li House
- Kafta House
- kBap Korean food
- Kim Jong Grillin'
- Rachel & Rose
- Shanghai's Best
- Tito's Burritos
- Villa Angel Taqueria

== See also ==
- Street plazas in Portland, Oregon
