= Green Loop =

Proposed urban design concept

The Green Loop
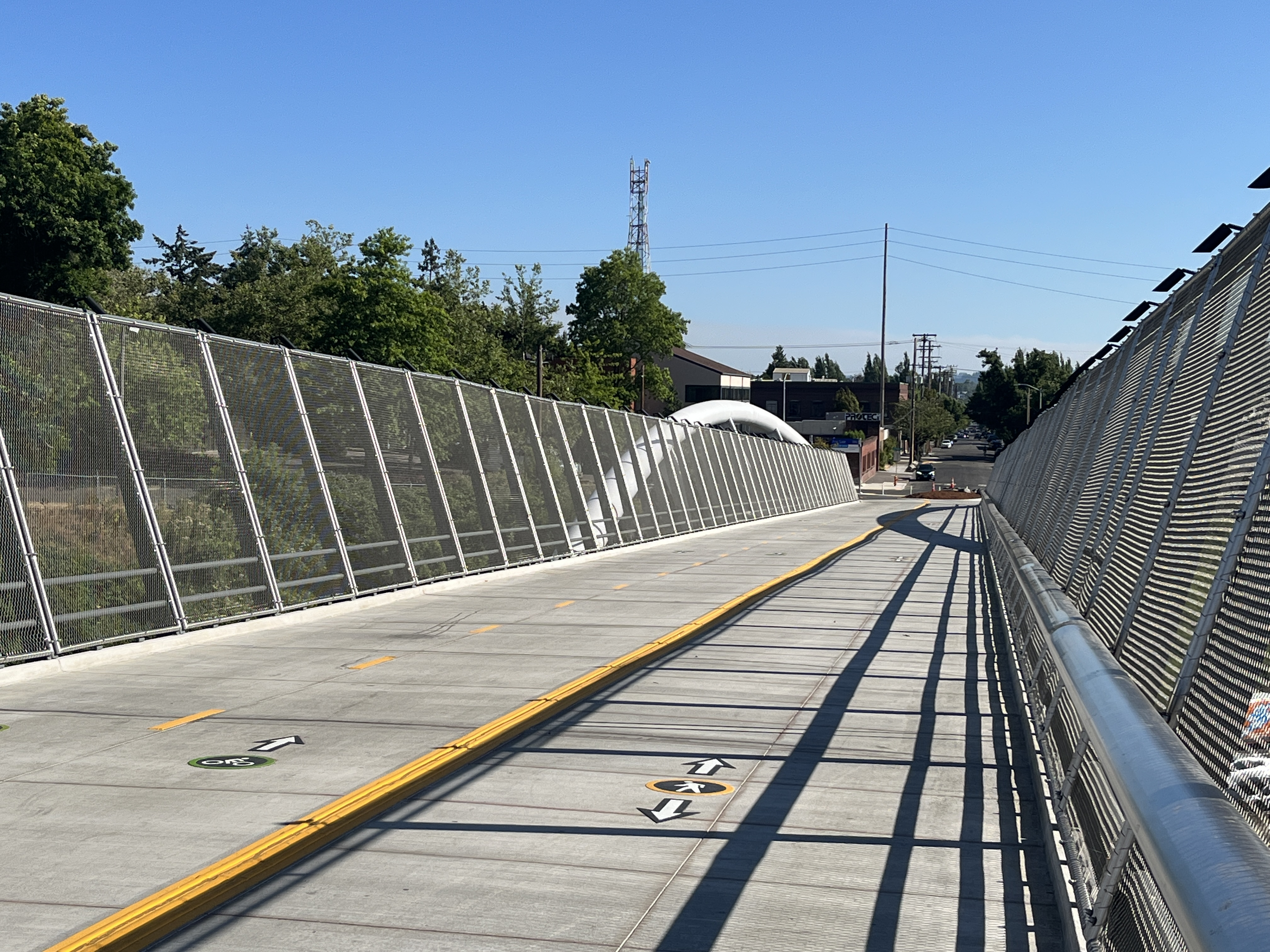
- The Blumenauer Bridge was the first section of the Green Loop to be completed
- Locale: Portland, Oregon, U.S.

Characteristics
- Design: linear park
- Total length: 6 mile (when complete)

History
- Designer: multiple
- Opened: in progress

The Green Loop is a proposed urban design concept for a 6-mile-long linear park in Portland, Oregon, United States. First put forward in 2012, The Green Loop is part of the Portland Central City 2035 plan. Rather than have a single consistent designer, the park will be made of multiple connecting projects led by neighborhood partners.

== Route projects ==
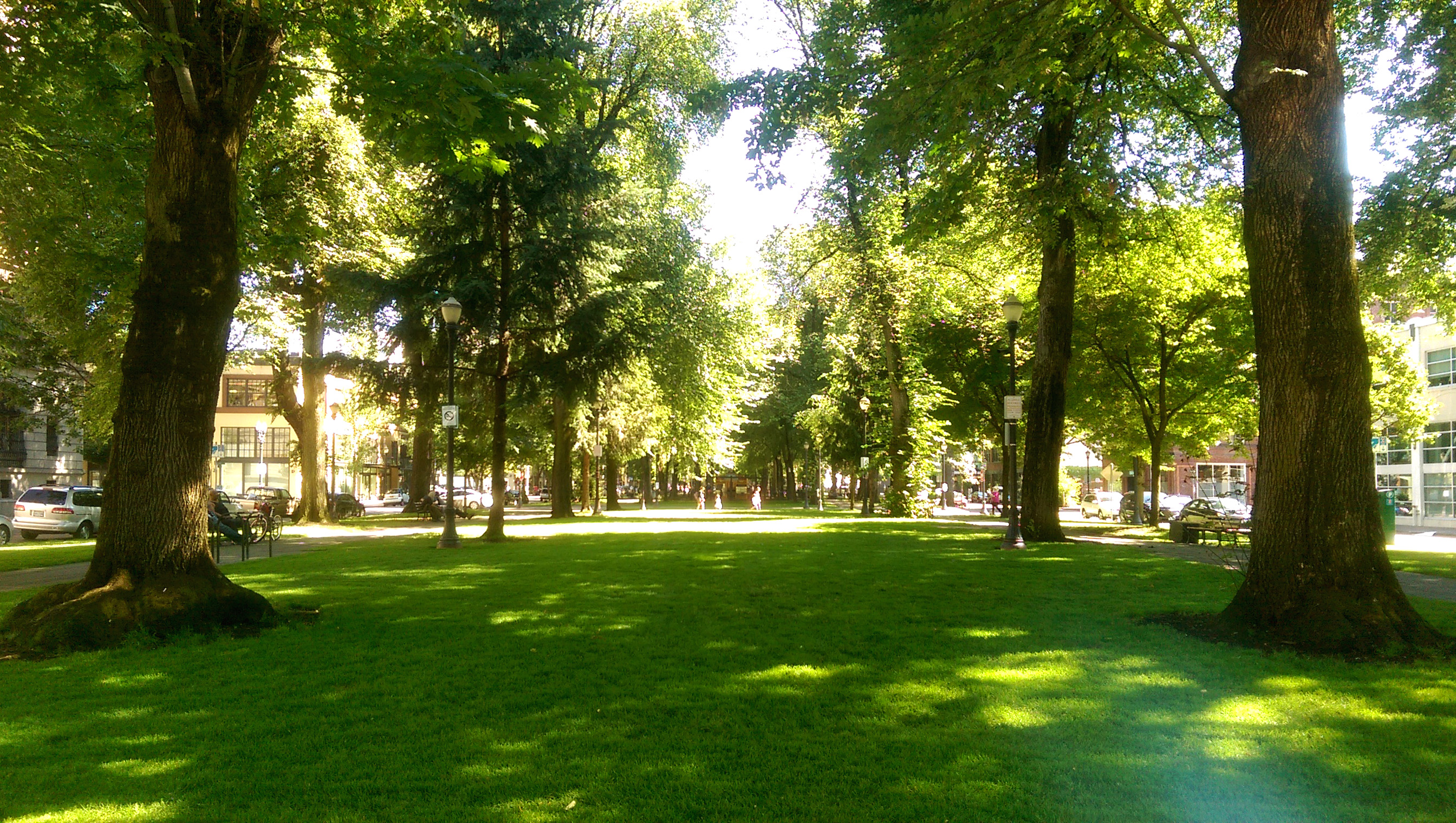
North Park Blocks

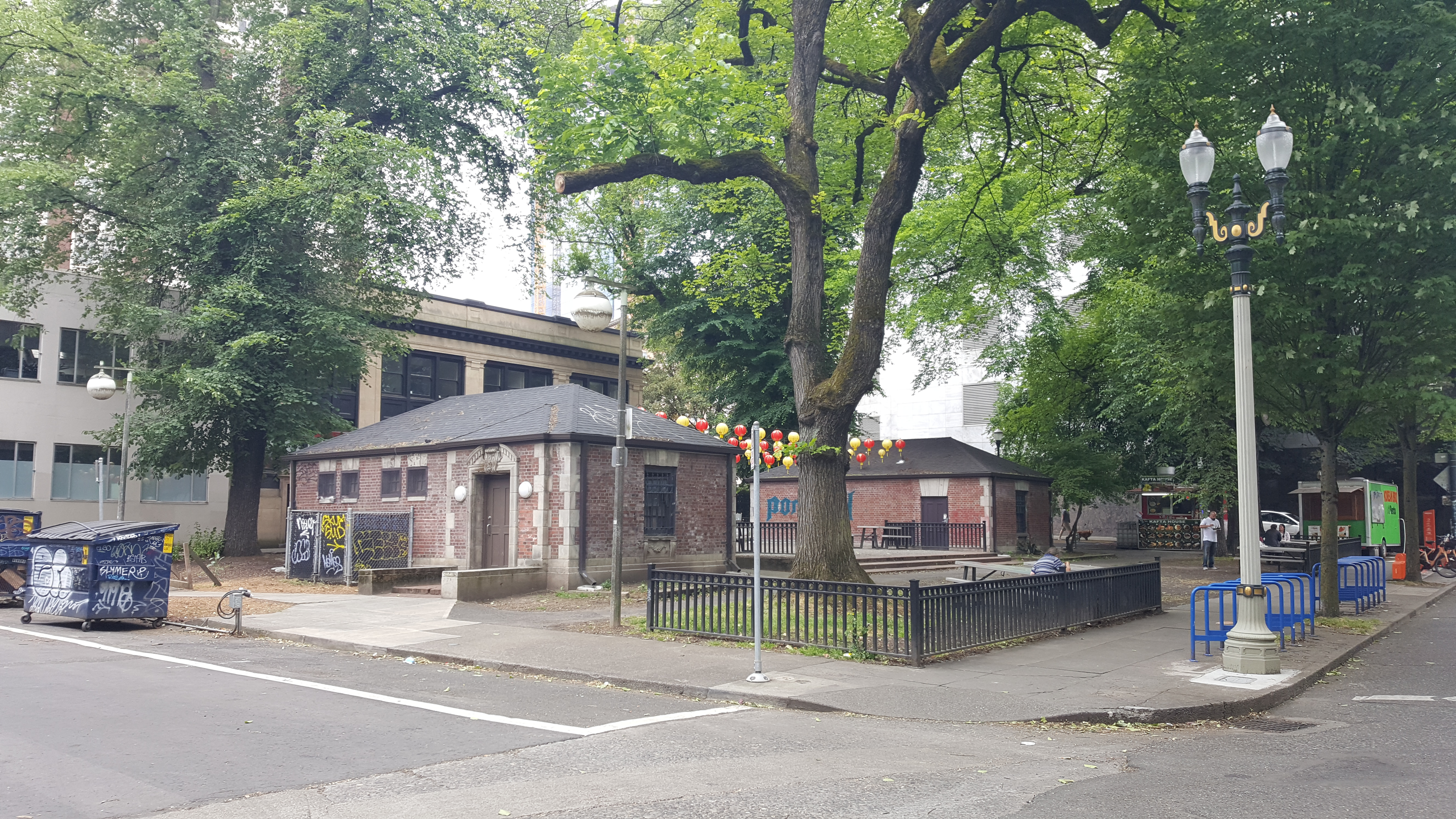
Cart Blocks

- Opened in 2022, The Blumenauer Bridge is the first finished portion the Green Loop, linking the Lloyd District with Kerns, Portland, Oregon for pedestrians and bikers.
- Construction on the I-5 Rose Quarter Improvement Project is set to begin in the summer of 2025 creating a pedestrian pathway between the Rose Quarter and the Lloyd District.
- The Broadway Corridor Project will continue the Green Loop through the addition of two new North Park Blocks. Construction began in 2024 and is estimated to take 15-20 years.
- Block 216 continues the Green Loop path for a single block through downtown.
- Central City in Motion includes multiple city updates related to the Green Loop on the east side of the Willamette River from Tilikum Crossing to Sullivan's Gulch, Portland, Oregon.
- The Culinary Corridor has been suggested as a way to add room for food carts along the path of the Green Loop as it moves through the heart of downtown. If the full idea were put in place, a parking lane from NW Burnside Blvd. through Portland State University would put food trucks in, what Randy Gragg (director of the Portland Parks Foundation) calls, “underused right of way." The Cart Blocks comprise a portion of this vision, along with Block 216 and Darcelle XV Plaza.
- The South Park Blocks Master Plan would expand the sidewalk along the west side of the south park blocks to create a Green Loop path.
- The Southwest Corridor Plan would have added a MAX Light Rail line between Portland State University and Tualatin, Oregon as well as improving biking and pedestrian infrastructure, however the project was paused in 2020 due to lack of funds.
- The OMSI Masterplan, approved by the City of Portland Design Commission in 2023, includes a portion of the Green Loop.

== See also ==
- City of Parks § Louisville Loop, a proposed ring around Louisville, Kentucky
- Indianapolis Cultural Trail, an 8.1 mile linear park in Indianapolis, Indiana
- High Line, a 1.4 mile linear park in New York City
- Beltline Trail, a 5.6 mile linear park in Toronto
