= Blow Pony =

Queer event in Portland, Oregon, U.S.

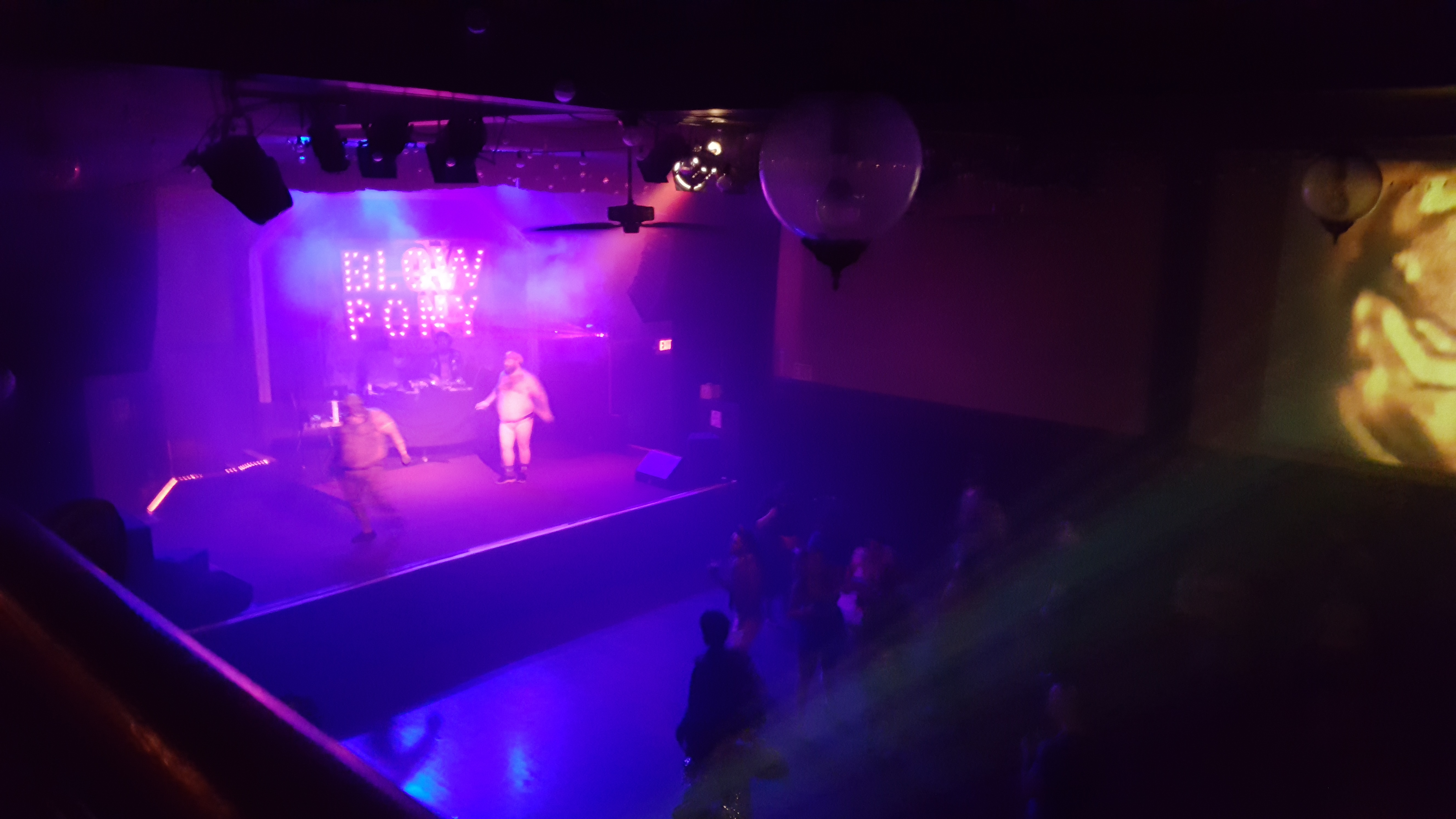
- An event getting started in October 2016
- Locations: Portland, Oregon; Denver
- Country: United States
- Attendance: 800–2,000
- Organizer: Airick Redwolf
- Website: blowpony.com

Blow Pony is a popular queer event based in Portland, Oregon, United States. The first event was held in 2007 and the last one is slated to take place in March 2026. Blow Pony Denver was held in 2015.

== Description ==
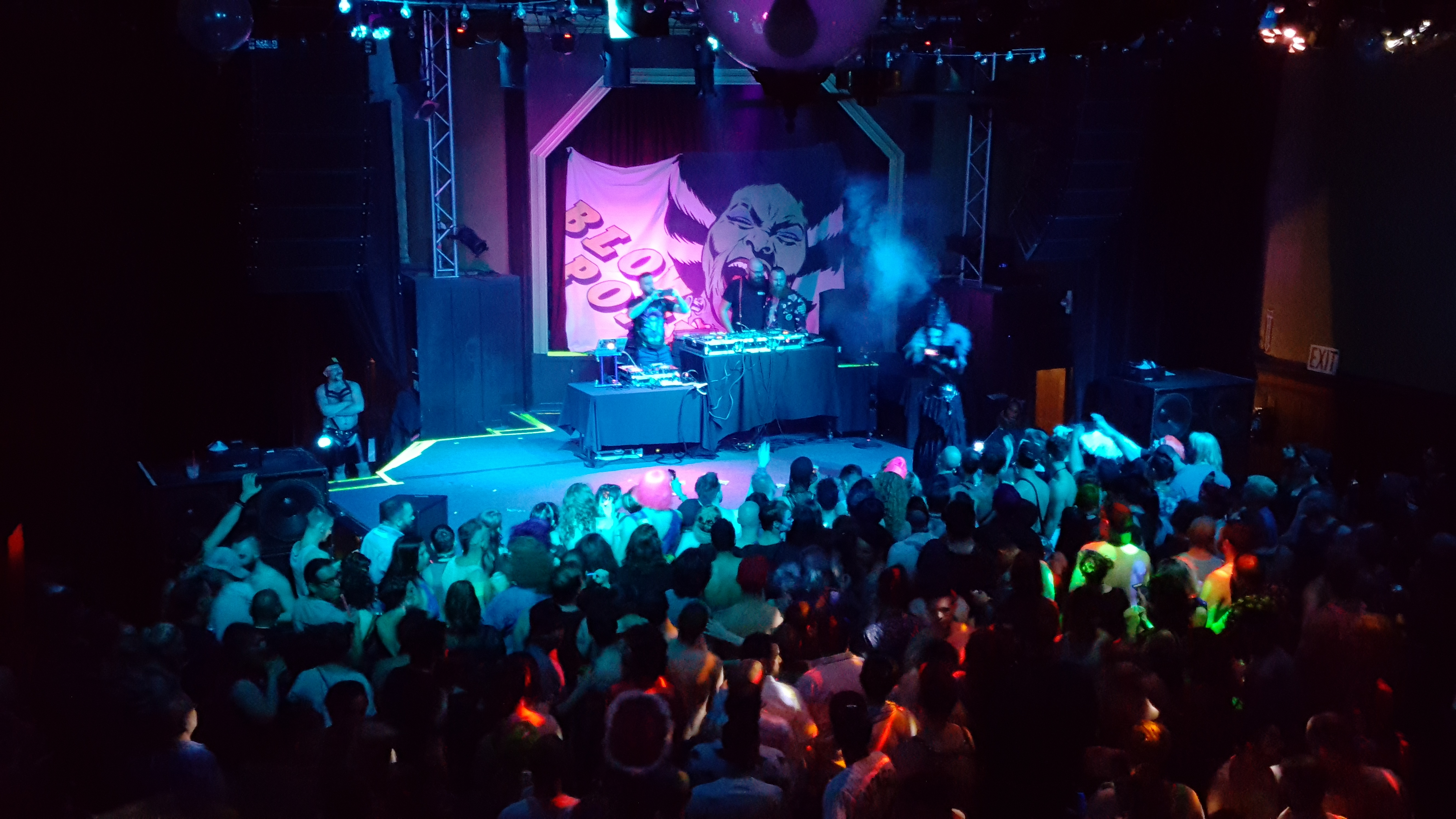
Blow Pony, 2018

Blow Pony is a queer event organized by nightlife promoter Airick Redwolf, who saw LGBTQ establishments targeting either men or women and wanted to create an event series inclusive to the entire community. Redwolf said of the event's origin and purpose:

Blow Pony was created as a place for people of all walks of life to gather in a respectful place, and to feel safer to express themselves, but also to showcase queer talent and queer artists. It's also a social, a dance, a good time. I moved to Portland from London, and the queer spots there are pretty much what you get with Blow Pony: low tolerance of bullshit and assholism, and a high tolerance of people expressing themselves and being themselves, respectfully. I enjoyed that. People were having fun and enjoying themselves and doing drugs and getting drunk, or not doing drugs or getting drunk—being sexual, enjoying music, whatever they felt that element was to bring them out of their box.

The recurring LGBTQ-based event is among Portland's most popular, drawing 800 people regularly, and sometimes as many as 2,000 people.

== History ==
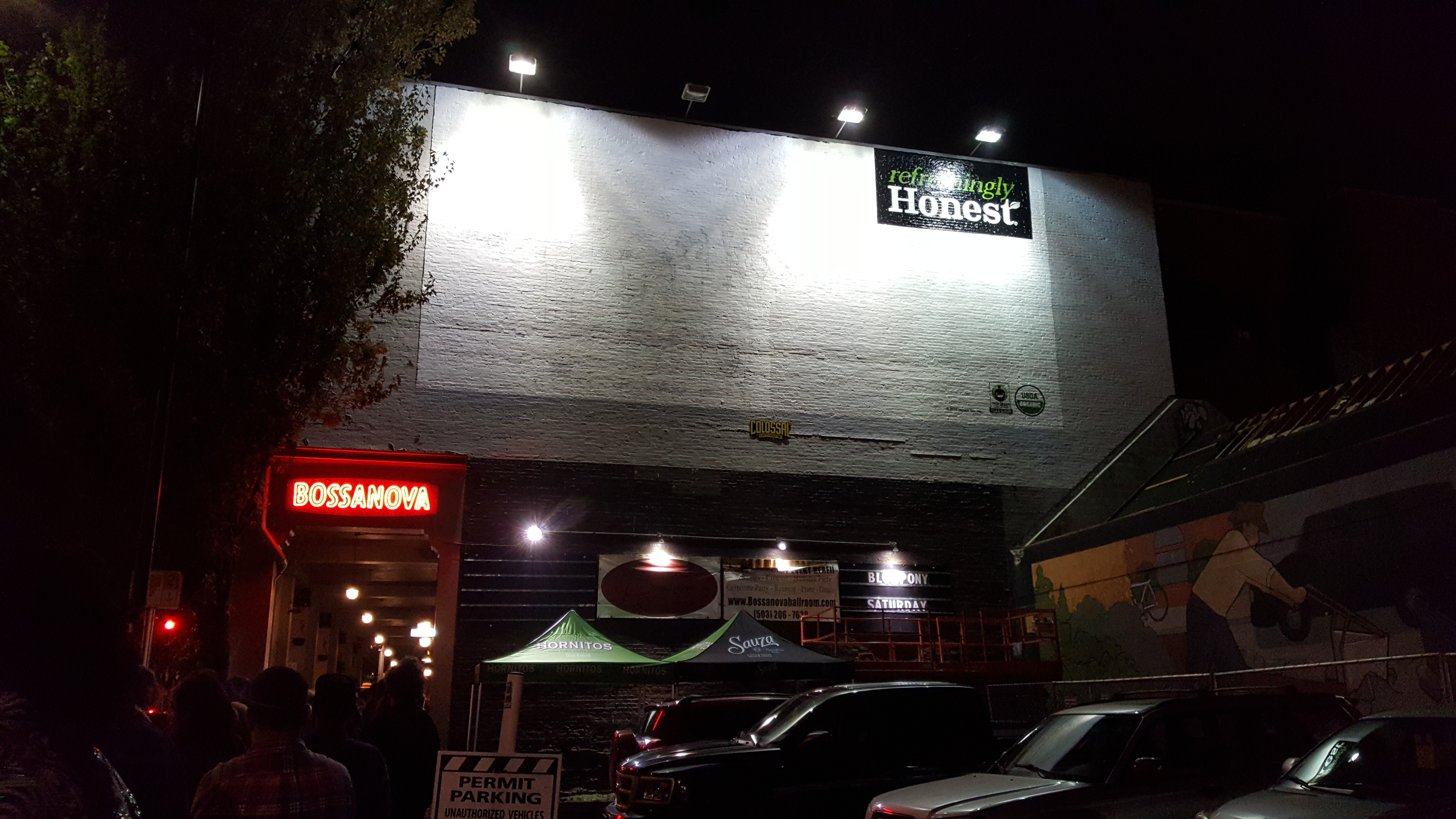
Exterior of Bossanova Ballroom for a "Blow Pony" event in October 2016

Blow Pony was established in 2007. It was originally held at the "old" Eagle gay bar on West Burnside Street. The event series was popular from the start, but had to relocate to the gay bar Casey's when the Eagle closed. Casey's hosted Blow Pony for less than a year due to conflicts with neighboring tenants and attacks on patrons.

From 2009 to 2016, the event was hosted at Euphoria Nightclub, a venue on Southeast 3rd Avenue with two levels: Rotture and Branx. The event hosted its eighth anniversary celebration in March 2015.

In June 2016, Euphoria changed ownership, and the new owner and his promotion company opted to target a single demographic and play only electronic dance music. The venue stopped hosting Blow Pony and its counterpart event Bearracuda immediately, despite event organizers having contractual agreements through November. Blow Pony started being held at Bossanova Ballroom, which also hosts the lesbian dance party Inferno, on July 16, 2016.

Blow Pony has also been held at the southeast Portland venue The Den. The event is slated to end in March 2026.

=== Guest performers ===
Bruce LaBruce was a guest disc jockey in 2008. Drag artists Laila McQueen and Peppermint were guest performers in 2017. American rapper Katey Red and drag artist Scarlet Envy were guest performers in 2018 and 2019, respectively. Drag artist A'keria C. Davenport was a guest performer in 2024. For the final event, drag performers Heidi N Closet and Kornbread Jeté are the scheduled headliner and guest host, respectively.

== Reception ==
Blow Pony and Bearracuda, which is billed as "the largest bear party in the world", have been called mainstays of Portland's queer community.

== See also ==
- Culture of Portland, Oregon
