= Pix Pâtisserie =

Restaurant in Portland, Oregon, U.S.

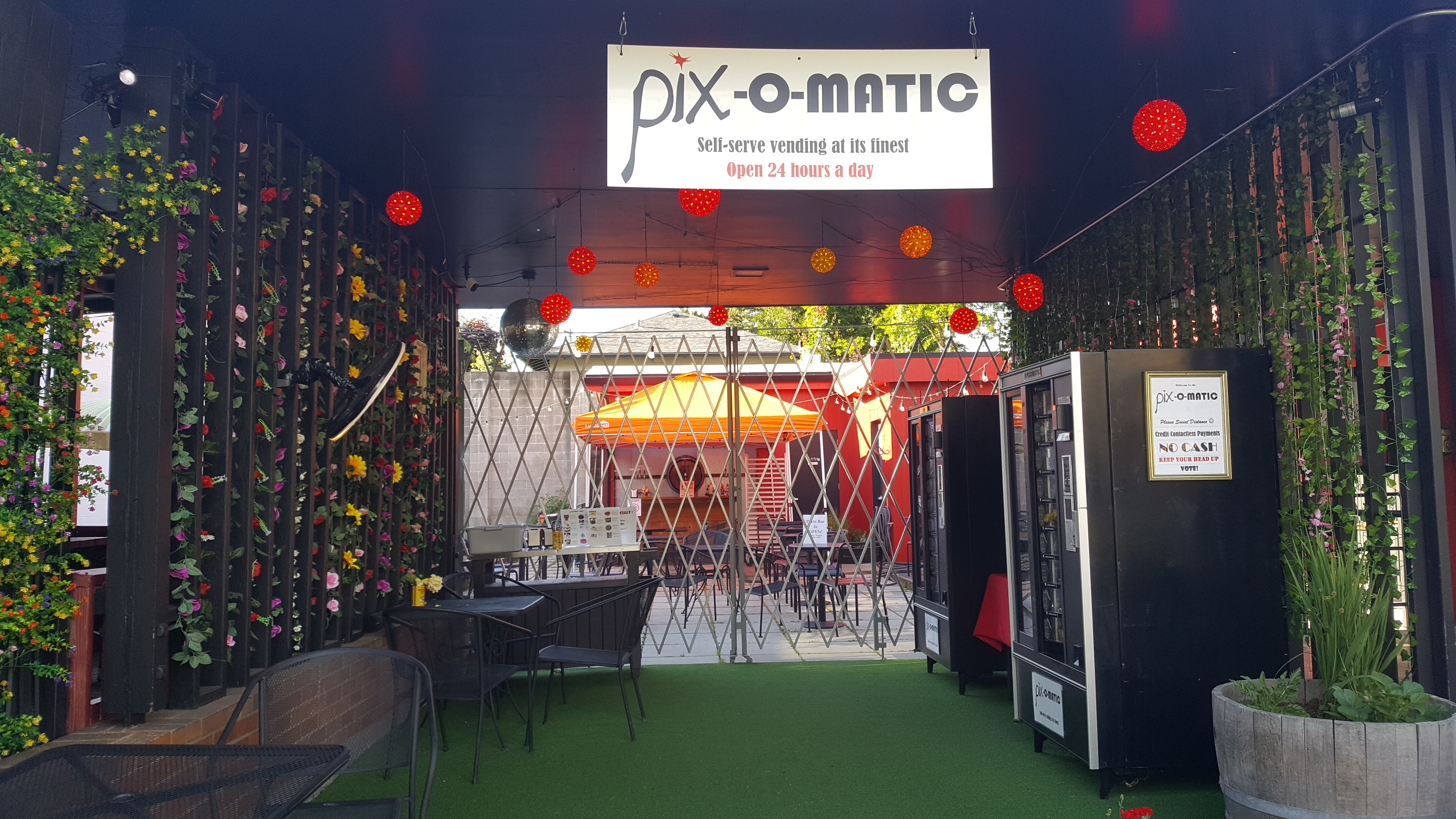
- Interactive map of Pix Pâtisserie

Restaurant information
- Previous owner: Cheryl Wakerhauser
- Location: 2225 East Burnside Street, Portland, Multnomah, Oregon, 97214, United States
- Coordinates: 45°31′23″N 122°38′34″W
- Website: pixpatisserie.com

Pix Pâtisserie is a bakery in Portland, Oregon, United States.

== Description and history ==
Pix operates a dessert and wine bar on East Burnside Street, as well as an outdoor vending machine called Pix-O-Matic.

The business was established in 2001, alongside adjoining Bar Vivant. Pix hosted a Bastille Day block party in 2011.

In August 2022, the business ceased trading.

=== Big Portland Bake Show ===
In 2026, Pix hosted the Big Portland Bake Show, a baking competition based on the British reality television series The Great British Bake Off. The event was free and open to amateur bakers of any age.

== Reception ==
Samantha Bakall of The Oregonian included Pix in a 2014 list of Portland's 10 best wine bars. In 2017, she also included the business in a list of "Portland's best dessert spots for Valentine's Day", and the newspaper's Michael Russell said Pix "might have the best Champagne list in the country". Thom Hilton included Pix and Bar Vivant in Eater Portland's 2022 list of "14 Spots for Late-Night Dining in Portland". Michelle Lopez and Janey Wong included Pix-O-Matic in the website's 2025 overview of Portland's best bakeries.

== See also ==
- List of bakeries
