= Dante's =

Nightclub in Portland, Oregon, U.S.

Coordinates: 45.5229°N 122.6736°W

- Logo

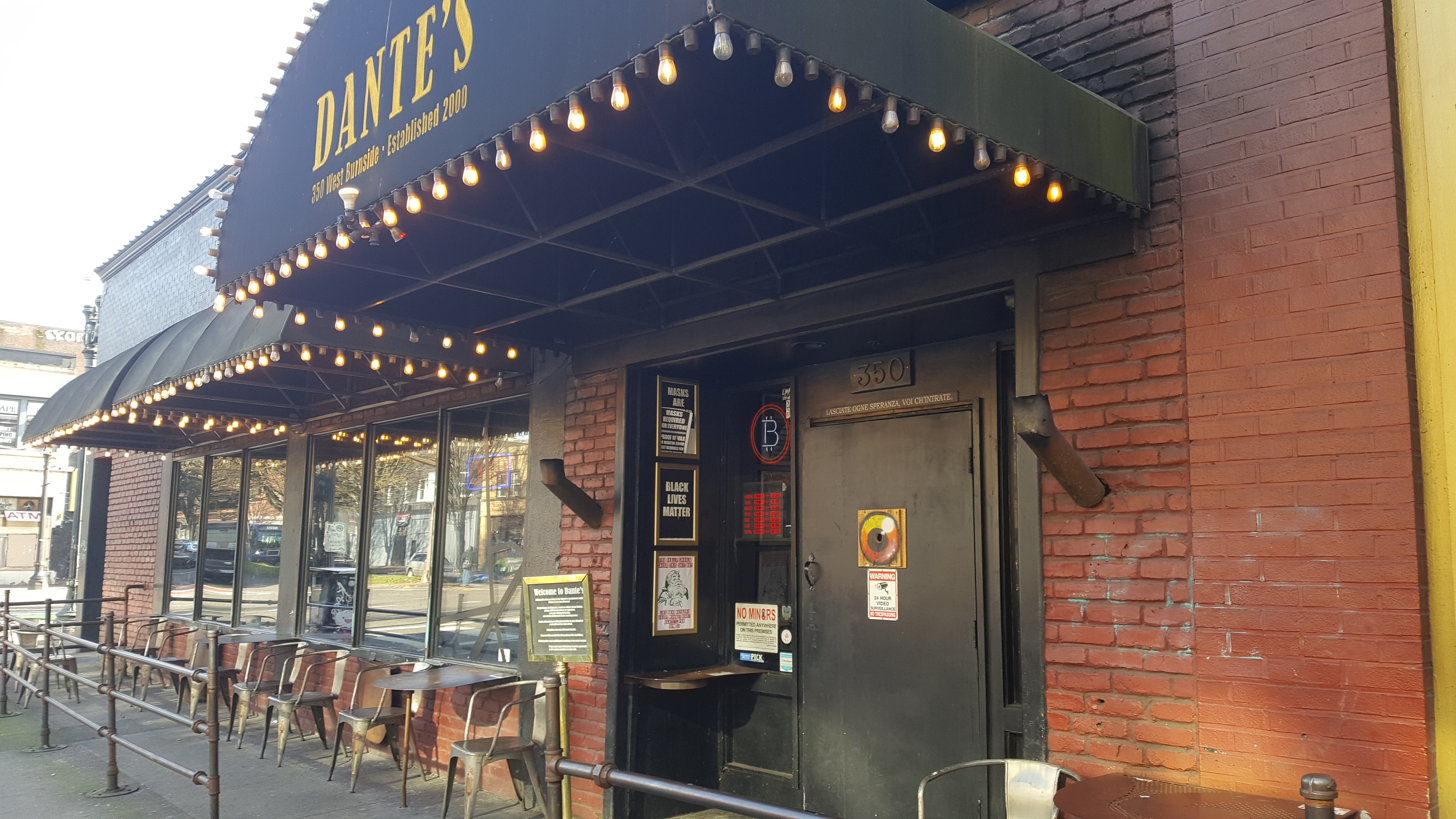
- The venue's exterior in 2022

- Location within the United States Location within Oregon Location within Portland, Oregon
- Address: 350 West Burnside Street
- Location: Portland, Oregon, U.S.
- Type: Nightclub; music venue

Construction
- Opened: 2000

Dante's is a nightclub and live music venue in Portland, Oregon. The venue, located along West Burnside Street and owned by Frank Faillace, hosts a variety of acts ranging from burlesque to rock music.

Dante's is housed in an unreinforced masonry building.

== History ==
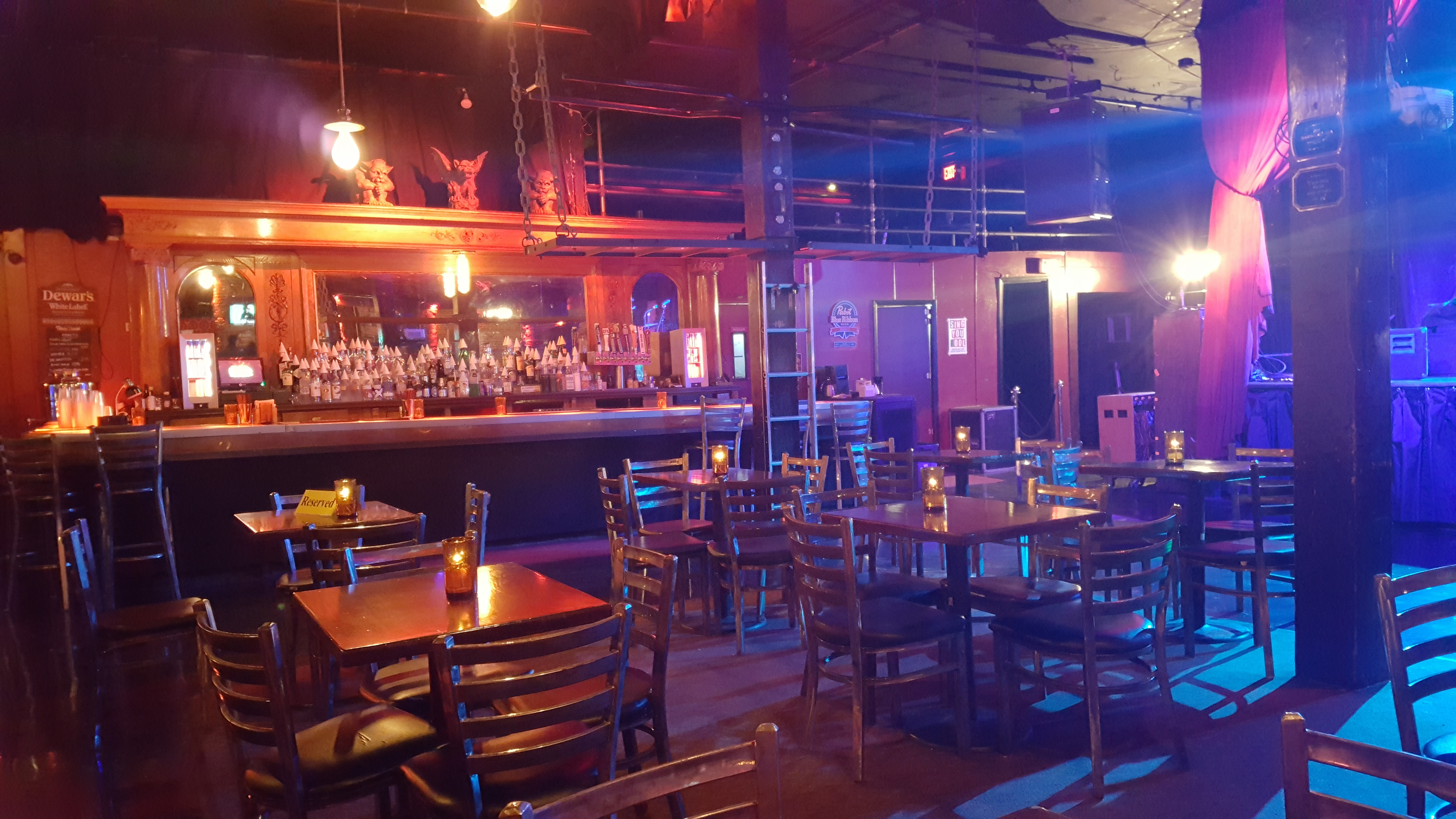
The venue's interior, 2022

Faillace opened Dante's in early 2000. In 2017, Pizza Slut replaced the bar's Lonesome's Pizza. Lonesome's had been ranked number seven in The Oregonian's 2013 list of "Portland's top 10 pizzas by the slice".

Doug Stanhope's Beer Hall Putsch standup album was recorded at Dante's in 2013. Katt Williams performed at the venue in 2018.

American Society of Composers, Authors and Publishers took Dante's to court in November 2018 for copyright infringement for unauthorized public performance of ASCAP members' creative work. According to ASCAP, it has made numerous attempts to contact the venue prior to legal actions.

== Reception ==
Dante's was a runner-up in the "Best Music Venue" category of Willamette Week's "Best of Portland Readers' Poll 2020".

== See also ==
- Culture of Portland, Oregon
