= Crystal Ballroom (Portland, Oregon) =

Historic building in Portland, Oregon, U.S.

- Cotillion Hall
- U.S. National Register of Historic Places
- Portland Historic Landmark
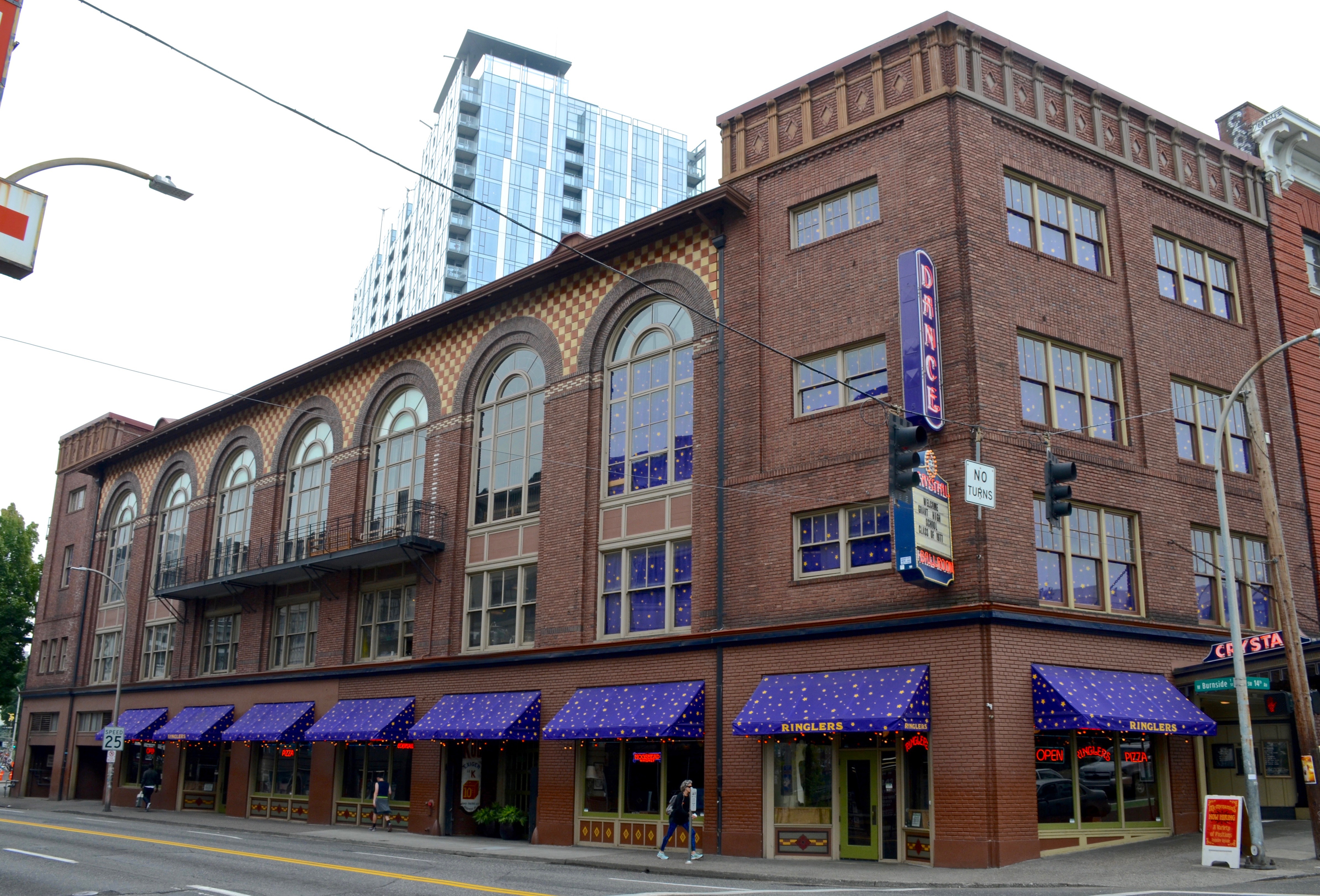
- From the northwest in 2017

- Location within Portland, Oregon
- Location: 1332 West Burnside Street; Portland, Oregon
- Coordinates: 45°31′22″N 122°41′06″W
- Built: 1913–1914
- Architect: Robert F. Tegan
- Architectural style: Romanesque Revival
- NRHP reference No.: 79002130
- Added to NRHP: March 9, 1979

Crystal Ballroom, originally built as Cotillion Hall, is a historic building on Burnside Street in Portland, Oregon, United States. Cotillion Hall was built in 1914 as a ballroom, and dance revivals were held there through the Great Depression. Starting in the 1960s, the hall has also been host to many popular pop, rock, folk, blues and jazz artists, as well as beat poetry and other entertainment.

== History ==
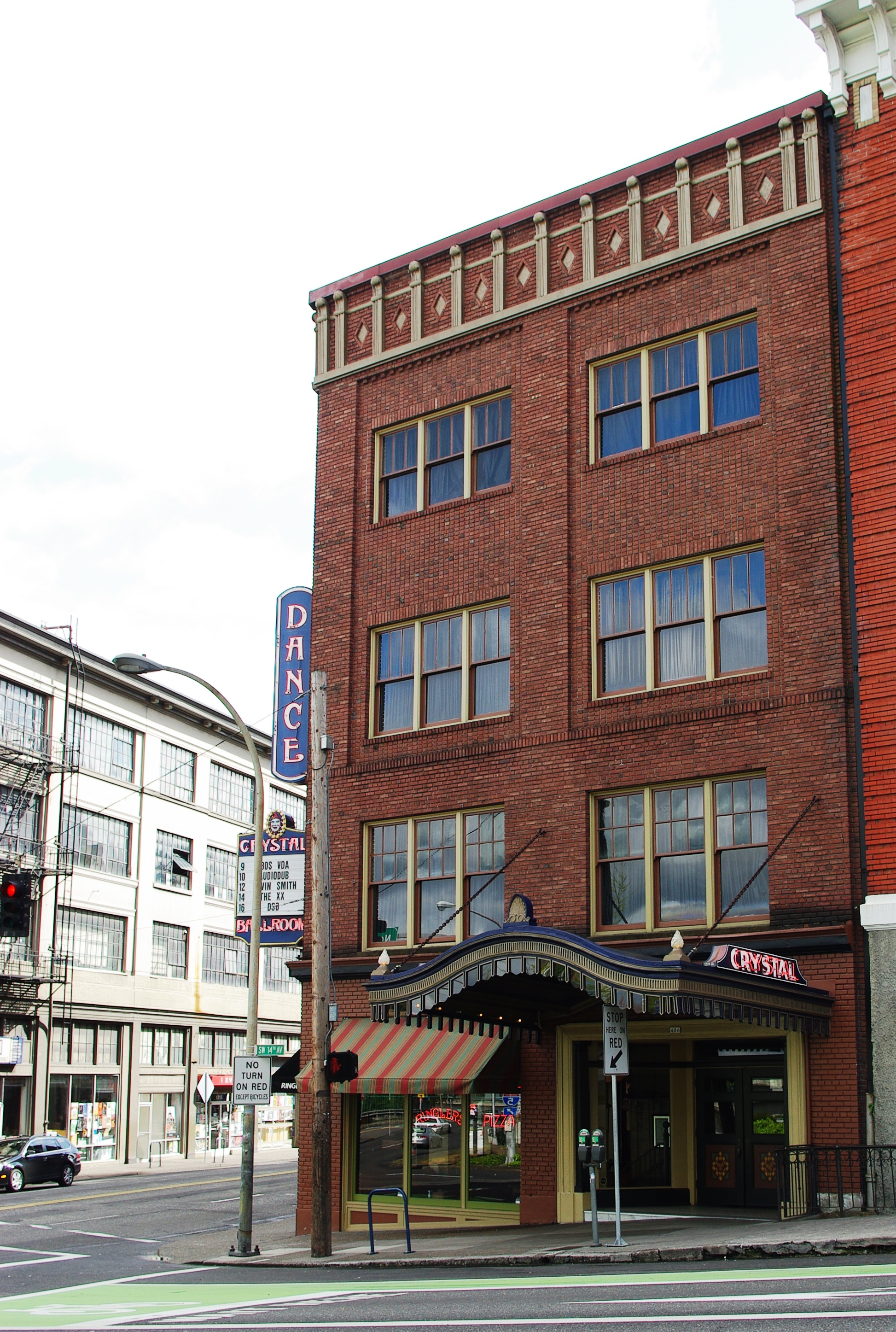
Entrance to the building

What is now known as the Crystal Ballroom was constructed in 1913–1914 and opened in early 1914, as Ringler's Cotillion Hall.

Following the reopening of the Crystal Ballroom in 1997, McMenamins expanded the nearby Crystal Hotel to reflect the historical significance of the Ballroom's memorable performances. The fifty-one guest rooms at the Crystal Hotel are named after songs or performances from the Crystal Ballroom's last one hundred years. The hotel also offers pre- and post-show concerts in conjunction with the Ballroom.

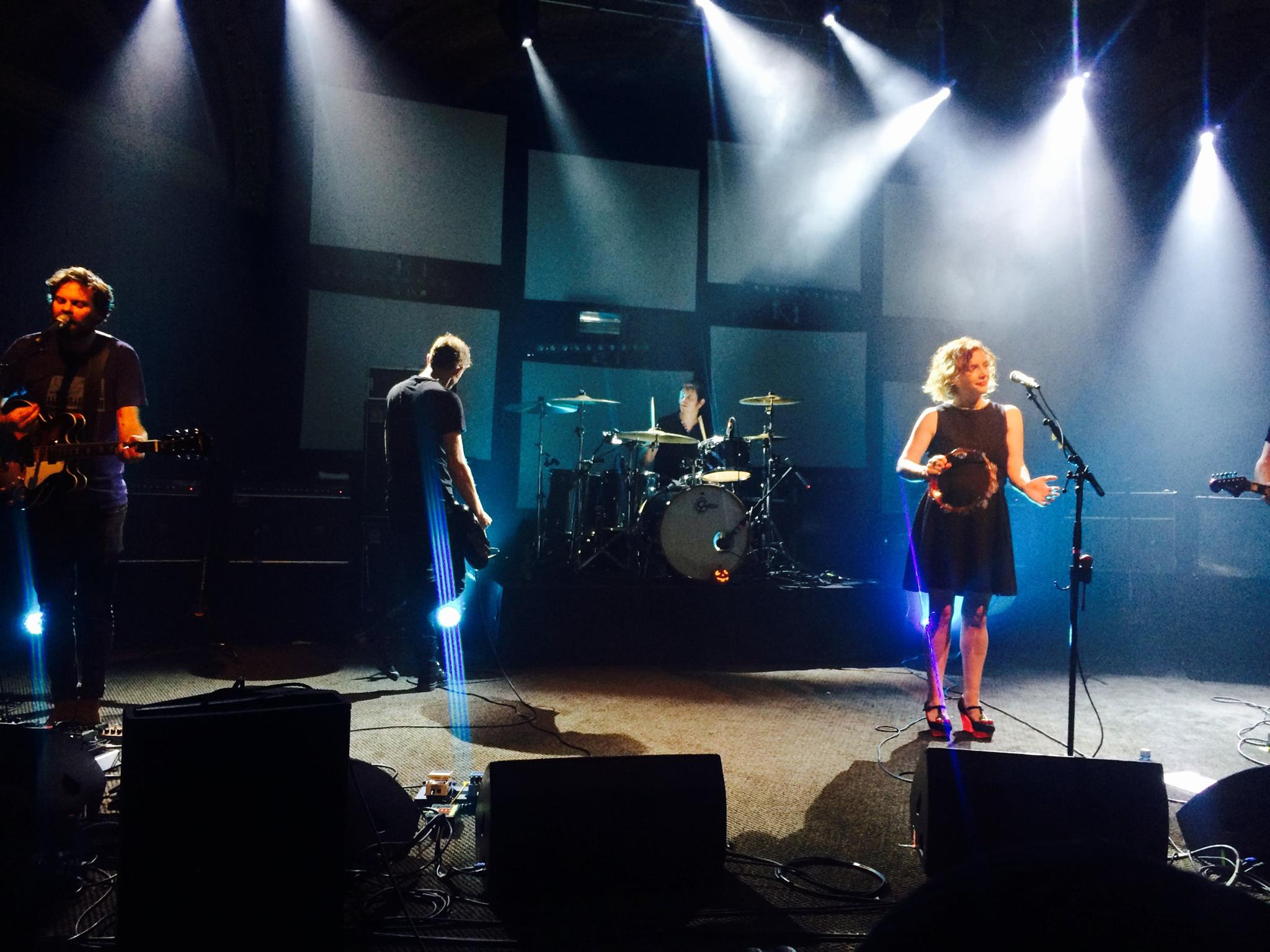
Slowdive plays at Crystal Ballroom in 2014.

== Facilities ==
The Crystal Ballroom—the third floor of the building—has high ceilings, a balcony, grand chandeliers, murals, and wide floor-to-ceiling arched windows.

The room can be rented for group meetings of up to 1,000 people or, in concert configuration, up to 1,500 standing persons or 850 seated.

== See also ==
- Culture of Portland, Oregon
