= Lonesome's Pizza =

Defunct pizzeria in Portland, Oregon, US

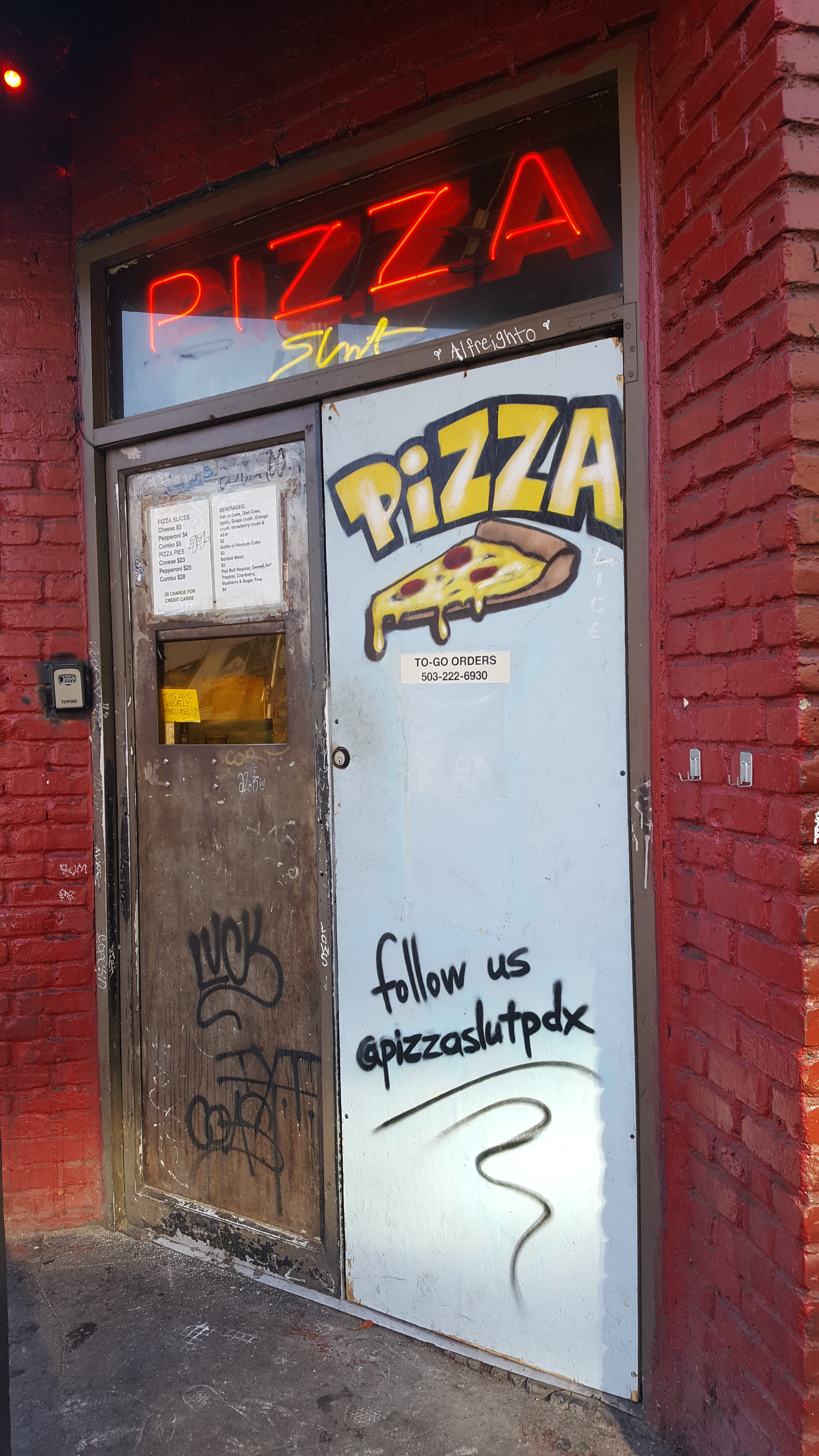
- Pizza Slut at Dante's in 2022; previously, the pizza window housed Lonesome's Pizza
- Interactive map of Lonesome's Pizza

Restaurant information
- Established: 2010
- Closed: July 2017
- Owners: Noah Antieu; Nic Reddy; Nik Sin
- Food type: Pizza
- Location: 1 Southwest 3rd Avenue, Portland, Multnomah, Oregon, 97204, United States
- Coordinates: 45.5229°N 122.6736°W

Lonesome's Pizza was a pizzeria in Portland, Oregon. Co-owners Noah Antieu, Nic Reddy, and Nik Sin started the delivery-only business in 2010. In 2012, Lonesome's began operating from a window at the nightclub and music venue Dante's. Known for its quirky pizza names and for including artwork and music with deliveries, the pizzeria closed in 2017.

== Description ==
Lonesome's Pizza was a pizzeria that operated from a window of the nightclub and music venue Dante's, on West Burnside Street in downtown Portland. The business used creative names for pies, such as the 'Dolph Lundgren vs. a Puma', and included "indie" artwork and music with deliveries. Willamette Week's Matthew Korfhage described the restaurant as a "late-night delivery pizza spot ... made famous for including edible glitter among its toppings and art in every box". Thrillist said Lonesome's had "funky" decor, "friendly" service and "always changing, whimsically named pies of the week".

The menu included classic, meat, vegan, and vegetarian pizzas. The 'Lou Ferrigno vs. a shark with throwing stars for teeth' had buffalo chicken. The 'Vingt Deux' had tomato sauce with Ethiopian spices, braised leg of lamb, and crumbled goat cheese. The vegan 'Treize' had Daiya cheese, seitan sausage, cherry tomatoes, scallions, and basil. Lonesome's Pizza was open as late as 4 am.

== History ==
Co-owners Noah Antieu and Nik Sin opened Lonesome's Pizza on West Burnside Street in mid 2010. Initially, the business only delivered pizzas, operating until 4 am from Wednesday to Sunday. The menu had "constantly-rotating" pizza names, such as a four-cheese pie called 'Jacques Cousteau vs. that stingray that killed the crocodile guy'. Nic Reddy has also been credited as a co-owner.

In November 2011, the pizzeria partnered with the Northwest Film Center to deliver DVDs showcasing winning shorts from the organization's film festival.

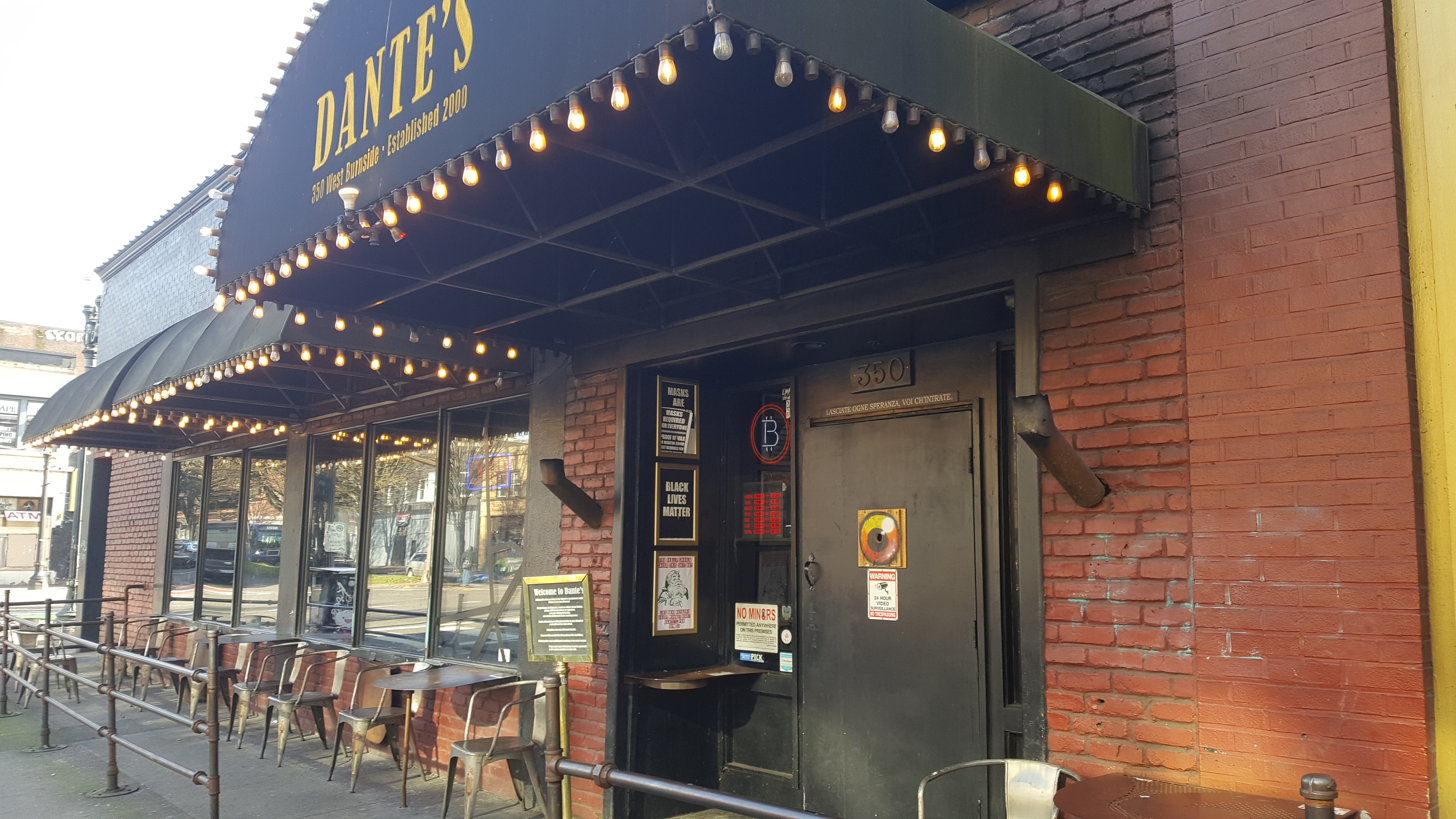
Exterior of Dante's, 2022

Lonesome's Pizza relocated to Dante's in September 2012. The move allowed the business to sell pizza by the slice, expand hours, and deliver to the city's west side. The pizzeria began offering four varieties of pizza by the slice at the window. After relocating, Lonesome's offered delivery from 11 am to 3 am (4 am on weekends), with the window open until 2:30 am.

In 2013, the business renamed one of the menu items following complaints from the transgender community. Lonesome's apologized and offered to change the name to "some other sophomoric, hopefully inoffensive name". Alison Hallett of the Portland Mercury opined, "Lonesome's gets a thumbs up on this one. The idea of kowtowing to sanctimonious activists clearly rankles them—as it rankles a lot of people who have lived in this town for more than 5 minutes—but they were able to get past that knee-jerk reaction to recognize that their jokey name had misfired, and to make a sincere, thoughtful apology."

=== Closure and mural ===
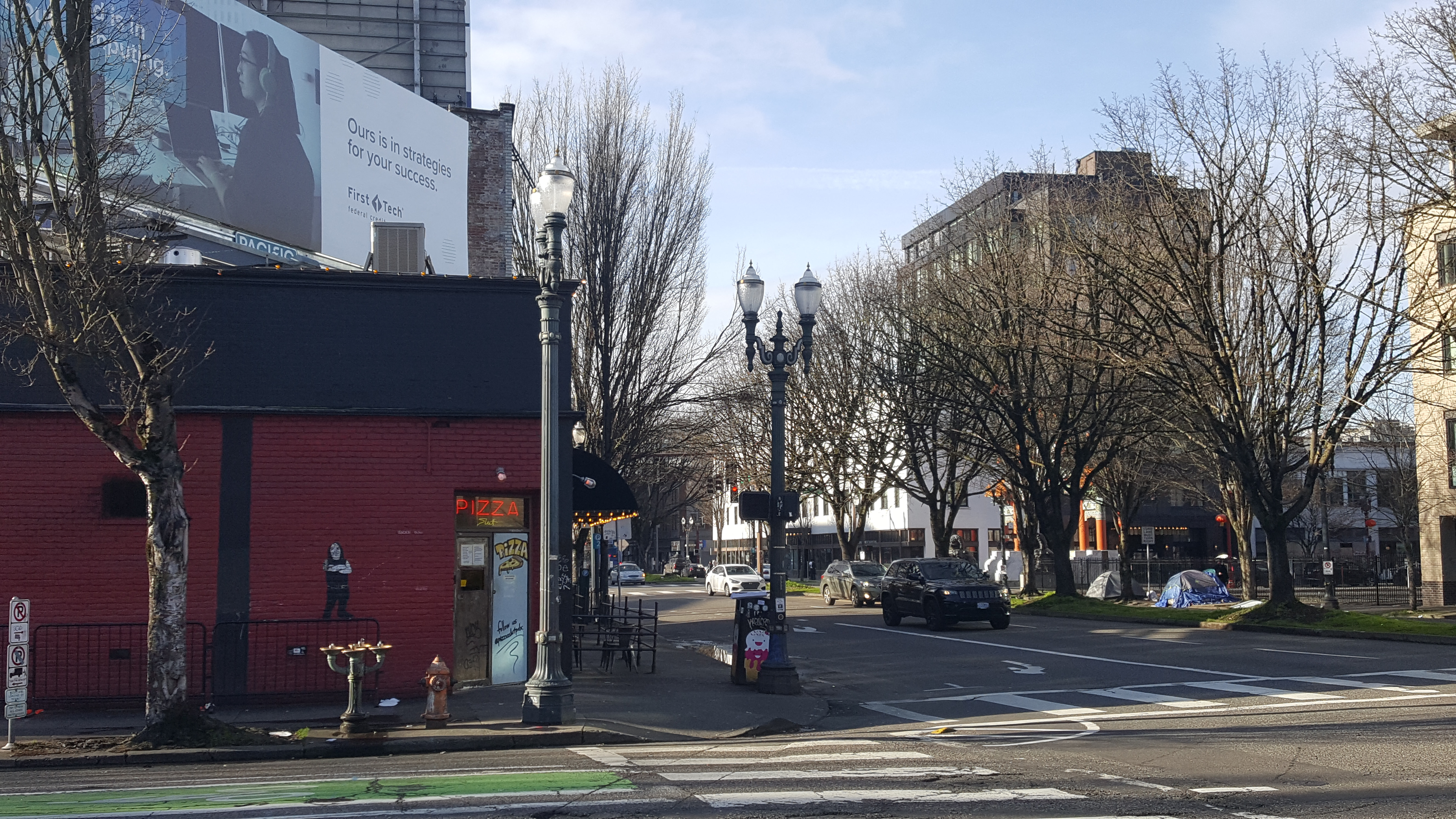
Pizza Slut occupying the pizza window at Dante's in 2022; the building's exterior had an "ever-changing" Lonesome's Pizza mural

The pizza window closed in early July 2017 and was replaced by Pizza Slut. Lonesome's Pizza's website was updated with information for donating to Planned Parenthood. Two weeks after Lonesome's Pizza closed, the Travel Channel published a positive review of the restaurant.

The "ever-changing" Lonesome's Pizza mural on the exterior of Dante's depicted Antieu and Sin, as of 2017. After the business announced plans to close, someone crossed out Antieu's face and added a heart and arrow pointing to Sin. Then, the image of Antieu was removed altogether. Frank Faillace, owner of Dante's, said: "The mural was their signage and since they are no longer in business the wall was returned to its previous state. There was some graffiti on the wall before it was painted over, but we have no information on it unfortunately, as our security cameras did not cover that area at the time it happened."

== Reception ==
In 2015, Thrillist's Andy Kryza said Lonesome's was Portland's best late-night pizza option. Chad Walsh included the business in Eater Portland's 2016 overview of local restaurants with "killer delivery options". The website's Mattie John Bamman described the pizzeria as "a true indie-style Portland classic" and said the business was "obsessively adored". The Travel Channel included Lonesome's Pizza in a list of 5 pizza establishments "worth checking out" in Portland.

In 2017, Martin Cizmar of Willamette Week said Lonesome's, plus the local pizzerias Hammy's and Sizzle Pie, were "as good as the best delivery pies in most cities". Lonesome's was included in the newspaper's 2017 overview of "where to get food late at night in Portland". Matthew Korfhage said Lonesome's was "famously quirky". After the business closed, Korfhage wrote, "we will forever miss their Fela Kuti mix CDs and their crouching tiger hidden whatever, their 'Hammy's Pizza vs. a wet paper bag with a mustache,' and their vingt-six by any name. In an age of Postmates, delivery pizza just got a little bit worse."

== See also ==
- Pizza in Portland, Oregon
