= Straight from New York Pizza =

Pizza chain in the U.S. state of Oregon

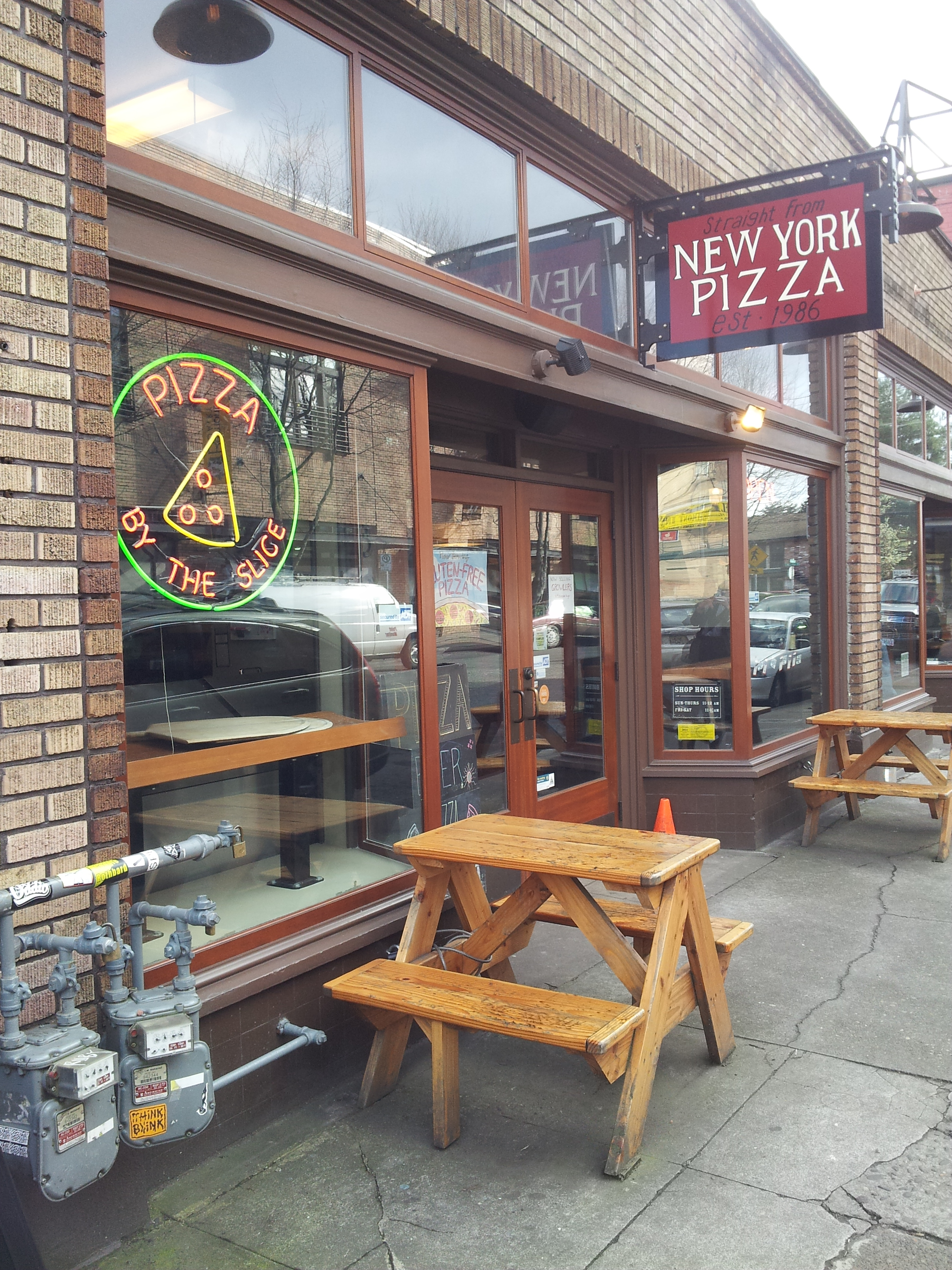
- Exterior of the Belmont Street pizzeria in southeast Portland, 2014

Restaurant information
- Food type: Pizza
- Location: Oregon, United States
- Website: sfnypizza.com

Straight from New York Pizza (SFNY) is a pizzeria based in the U.S. state of Oregon.

== Description ==
Straight from New York Pizza (SFNY) is a pizzeria serving New York–style pizza.

== History ==
Mike Rice and Ian Jacobson opened the first pizzeria in downtown Salem in 1986. Two additional locations opened in Salem within a decade. There were three locations in Portland by 2018:

- Belmont Street in southeast Portland's Sunnyside neighborhood
- West Burnside Street in northwest Portland's Northwest District
- Hawthorne Boulevard in the Sunnyside neighborhood

== See also ==
- List of restaurant chains in the United States
- Pizza in Portland, Oregon
