= Rontoms =

Bar in Portland, Oregon, U.S.

- Logo
- Interactive map of Rontoms
- Address: 600 East Burnside Street; Portland, Oregon; United States
- Coordinates: 45°31′21.9″N 122°39′34.2″W
- Owner: Ron Tom

Construction
- Opened: November 2006

Website
- rontoms.net

Rontoms is a bar in Portland, Oregon, United States. It opened along East Burnside Street, in southeast Portland's Buckman neighborhood, in November 2006.

== Description ==
Rontoms is a dimly lit bar on East Burnside Street, in southeast Portland's Buckman neighborhood. In 2017, Mike Seely of The New York Times described the venue as a "quirky east side lounge with a patio covered by a massive geometric wooden roof" and table tennis.

In 2018, Willamette Week described the clientele as a "mesmerizing gyre of the young and hip". The happy hour menu included a French dip, skewers with chicken, a Caesar salad, and jackfruit tacos.

== History ==
Rontoms opened in November 2006. Theo Craig booked talent for the Rontoms Sunday Sessions, described as a "weekly local-music showcase", from 2012 to 2015. He was replaced by Boone Howard, the venue's sound engineer.

In 2016, Willamette Week described the Sunday Sessions as "a place to catch rising talent before it rises high enough to start commanding a cover charge". Rontoms hosted a New Year's Eve party in 2018.

== Reception ==
In Thrillist's 2014 overview of Portland's bars with fireplaces, Drew Tyson said the bar has been "voted the best" outdoor patio in the city. In 2016, Matthew Singer of Willamette Week described Rontoms as one of Portland's "major tastemaking venues", along with the Doug Fir Lounge and Mississippi Studios, but criticized the venue for not showcasing enough hip hop talent. In a list of the best "party porches and patios" in Portland, the newspaper said, "The gigantic Rontoms patio welcomes all comers, in all seasons. Expect it to be packed every summer." In 2016 lists of Portland's best happy hours, Willamette Week's Matthew Korfhage called the jackfruit tacos "quite good" and said:

Rontoms, once prized for its retro stylings, now looks oddly dated, the vintage record player housing the water looking like a relic of another time. The huge bar space is now sort of a front for the back patio, where the real action is. Visit during happy hour between May and October, and pretty much every social demographic under age 40 is gathered out back.

MJ Skegg of the Portland Mercury also included Rontoms on a best patios list. In 2017, Michael Russell of The Oregonian said Rontoms had one of the city's best patios. and Willamette Week described the venue as "modern Southeast Portland's original catch-all party patio", and the newspaper's Jack Russell deemed Rontoms a "yuppie" bar. Willamette Week readers ranked Rontoms third place in the Best Patio, Best Place to See Free Music, and Best Bar categories in the 2017 readers' poll; additionally, the bar was named runner-up in the Best Place to Play Pingpong category.

In his overview of the city's best bars for the Portland Mercury's 2018 "visitor's guide" to the city, Thomas Ross wrote, "While it may have a bit of a hipster reputation, don't let that put you off, as Rontoms has a splendid patio with mixed seating options and fire pits—and there's ping-pong." Willamette Week's 2018 list of "Portland's Best Party Porches and Bar Patios" said, "You may think you're "over" Rontoms, but no one is too cool for its sprawling patio and the free music it offers every Sunday night." The newspaper's Ben Stone and Tyler Pell recommended Rontoms for table tennis.

In his 2019 overview of the city's nightlife, Thrillist's Pete Cottell wrote, "Say what you will about its reputation as a 'hipster' bar (as if that even means anything anymore), Rontoms is still one of the few spots in Portland that almost can agree on. And when ascendant indie bands take the sleek stage for the space's weekly Sunday Sessions, music fans and club kids of all stripes flock to Lower Burnside to bask in the energy." Cottell also included Rontoms in his 2019 list of the city's "best bars for single mingling". He wrote in 2020, "Like death and taxes, Rontoms will always be there with a seat on the patio and a cheap can of Tecate to soak up the sadness. The glory days of packed Sunday Sessions and happy hour hijinx on sunny afternoons are dearly missed, but it’s actually kinda nice to show walk into Rontoms and just relax at a table with an Urban Cowboy and a juicy burger topped with bleu cheese and bacon jam."
