= Bearracuda =

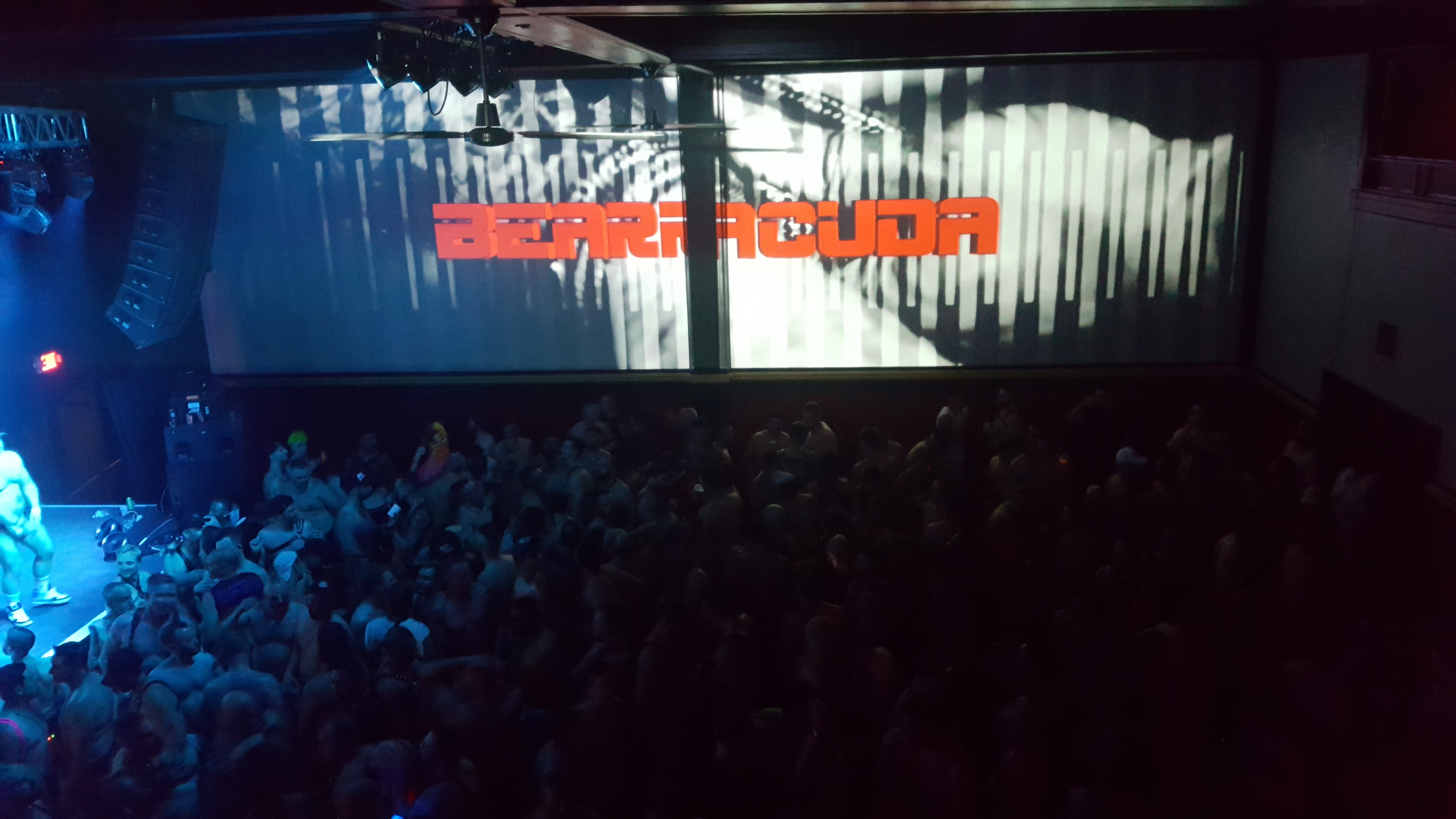
Bearracuda at Bossanova Ballroom in Portland, Oregon, 2021

Bearracuda is a series of dance parties catering to the bear community. According to The Advocate, Bearracuda "is the largest attended bear dance party and most prolific gay dance event in the U.S.", with events in 40 cities globally. The series began in San Francisco in August 2006.

== Locations ==
Dance events have been held in the following cities:

- Atlanta, Georgia
- Austin, Texas
- Birmingham, Alabama
- Chicago, Illinois
- Denver, Colorado
- Las Vegas, Nevada
- London
- New Orleans, Louisiana
- New York City
- Portland, Oregon
- San Francisco
- Seattle
- Sydney

== Reception ==
The San Francisco Bay Guardian called Bearracuda the "Best Club for Queer Men" in 2008, 2009, 2010, and 2011.
