= Dimo's Apizza =

Pizzeria in Portland, Oregon, U.S.

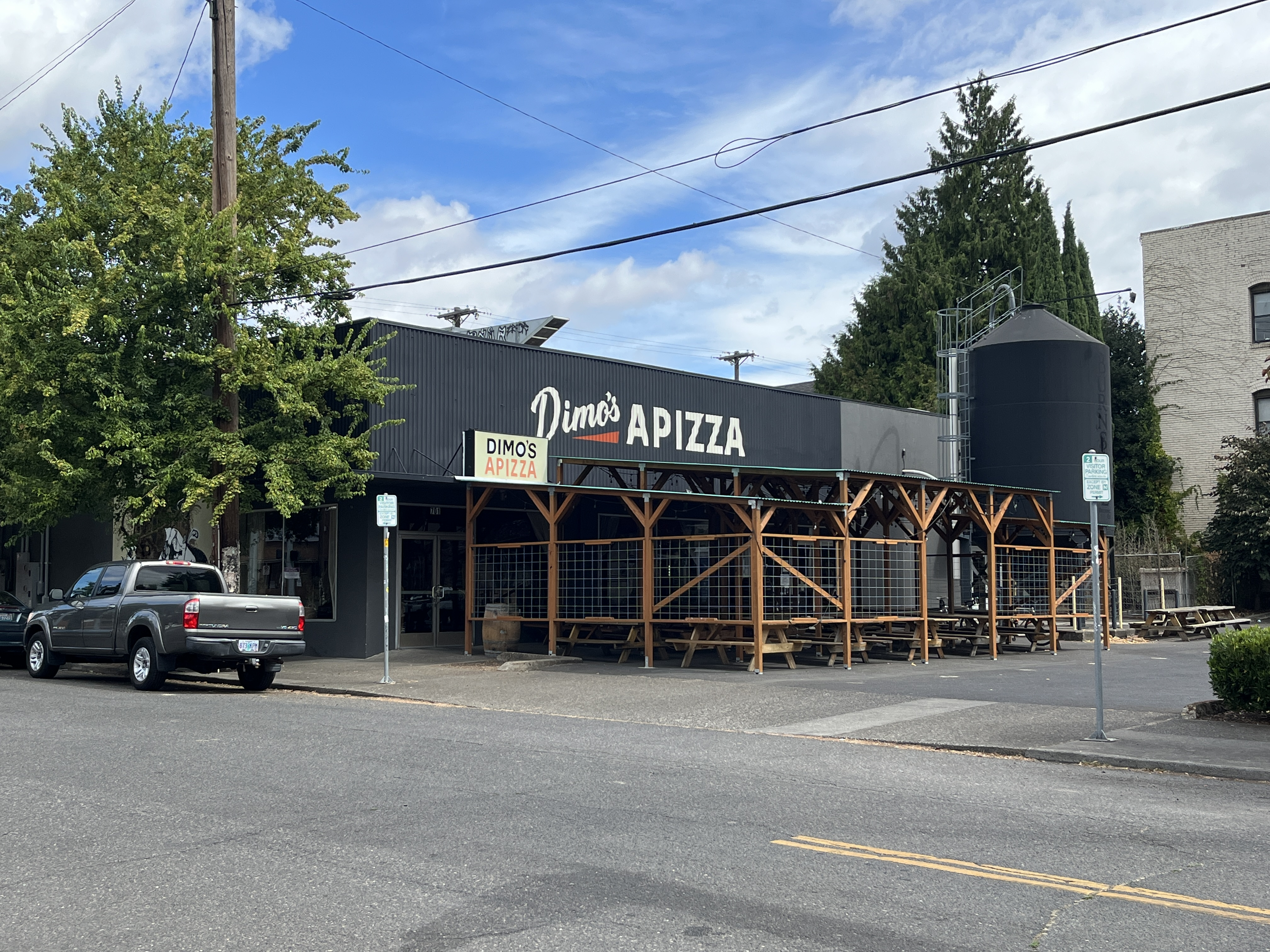
- The restaurant's exterior, 2022
- Interactive map of Dimo's Apizza

Restaurant information
- Owner: Doug Miriello
- Chef: Doug Miriello
- Food type: Italian (pizza)
- Location: 701 East Burnside Street, Portland, Multnomah, Oregon, 97214, United States
- Coordinates: 45.5234°N 122.6584°W
- Website: dimosapizza.com

Dimo's Apizza is a pizzeria in Portland, Oregon, United States.

== Description ==
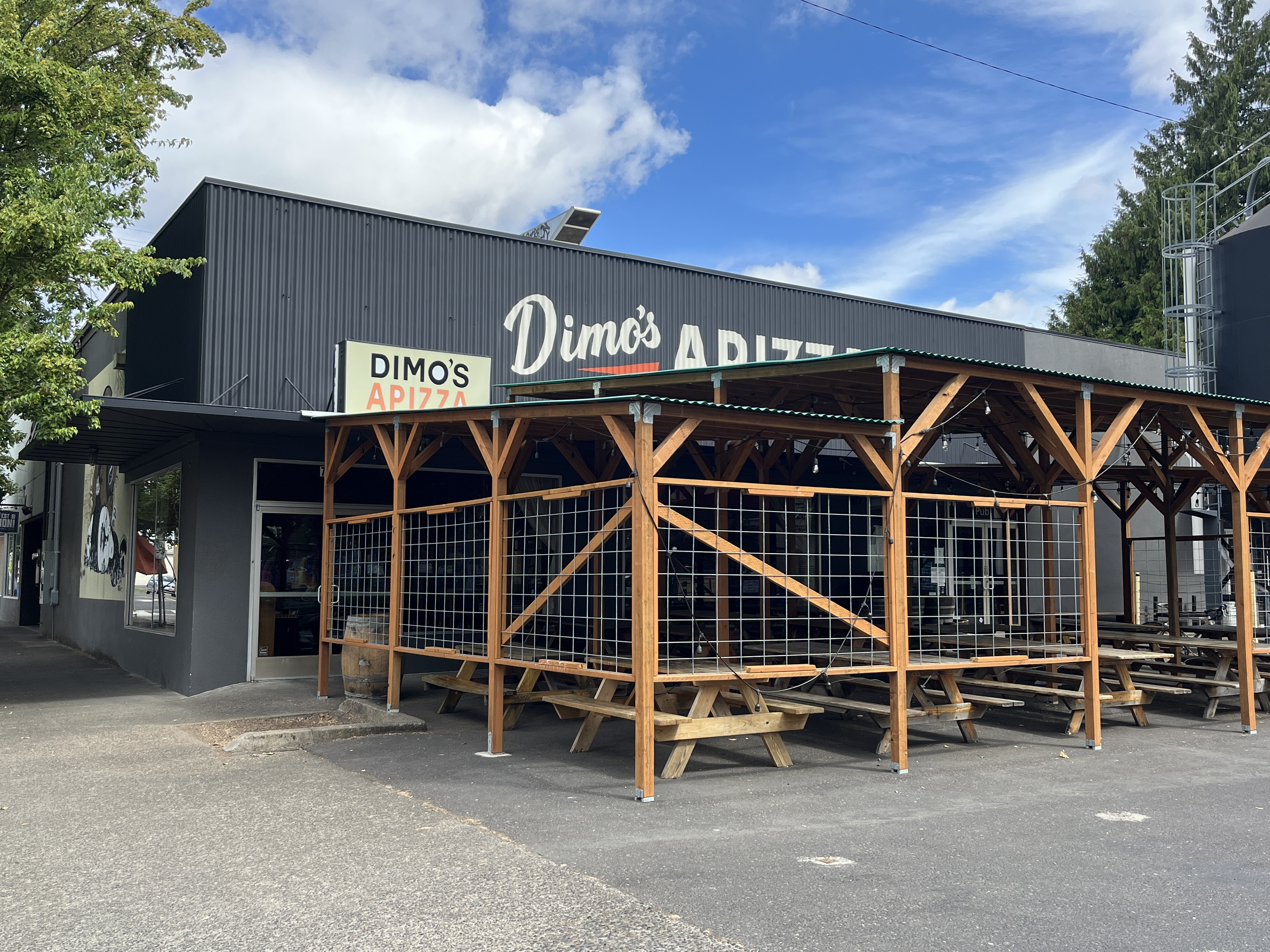
Exterior, 2022

Dimo's Pizza is a pizzeria on East Burnside Street in southeast Portland's Kerns neighborhood. The restaurant serves New Haven-style pizza from a coal-fired oven; varieties include tomato with garlic, cacio e pepe with black-pepper-pecorino cream, tomato confit, and zucchini, and clams with garlic, parsley, and chili flakes. 'The Father' has sausage and pickled peppers, and the 'Hail Mary' has soppressata, Calabrian chile, and Castelvetrano olives. The special called 'This Bacon Is Radicchio!' has bacon, radicchio, caramelized red onions, tomato confit, fontina, and thyme. 'The G.O.A.T.' had tomatoes, sweet summer corn, caramelized red onions, scamorza, goat cheese, parsley, mint, and basil.

In addition to pizzas, the restaurant has served sandwiches, including chicken parmesan and roast beef on sesame baguettes. 'The Beast' includes whole top sirloin seasoned like brisket, Gruyère, and aioli. Breakfast sandwiches have egg and cheese with bacon or Taylor ham on poppy seed hard rolls.

== History ==
Chef Doug Miriello opened Dimo's in July 2020, in a space which previously housed Burnside Brewing Company and the Danish brewery Mikkeller. Eater Portland's Brooke Jackson-Glidden described the restaurant, named after Miriello's grandmother, as "a new, outdoor, potentially permanent pizza pop-up". In 2021, Dimo's hosted a 420 event in collaboration with Oma's Hideaway and the cocktail pop-up Shipwreck. A special pizza included wood-roasted Chinese eggplant, tomato sambal, lemon, cumin yogurt, herbs, and fried garlic. Some proceeds from the event benefitted Last Prisoner Project, which "aims to rectify the harms of cannabis criminalization". In April 2022, the restaurant served a 4-course dinner meal.

== Reception ==
Willamette Week included Dimo's in a list of "Five Great New Restaurants That Opened in 2020". Karen Brooks included Dimo's in Portland Monthly's 2021 overview of the city's best restaurants and named the pizzeria as one of three which "bolster the case that Portland is America's best pizza city".

Katrina Yentch included Dimo's in Eater Portland's 2025 overview of the best restaurants in the Buckman area of southeast Portland.

== See also ==
- Pizza in Portland, Oregon
