= HunnyMilk =

Restaurant in Portland, Oregon, U.S.

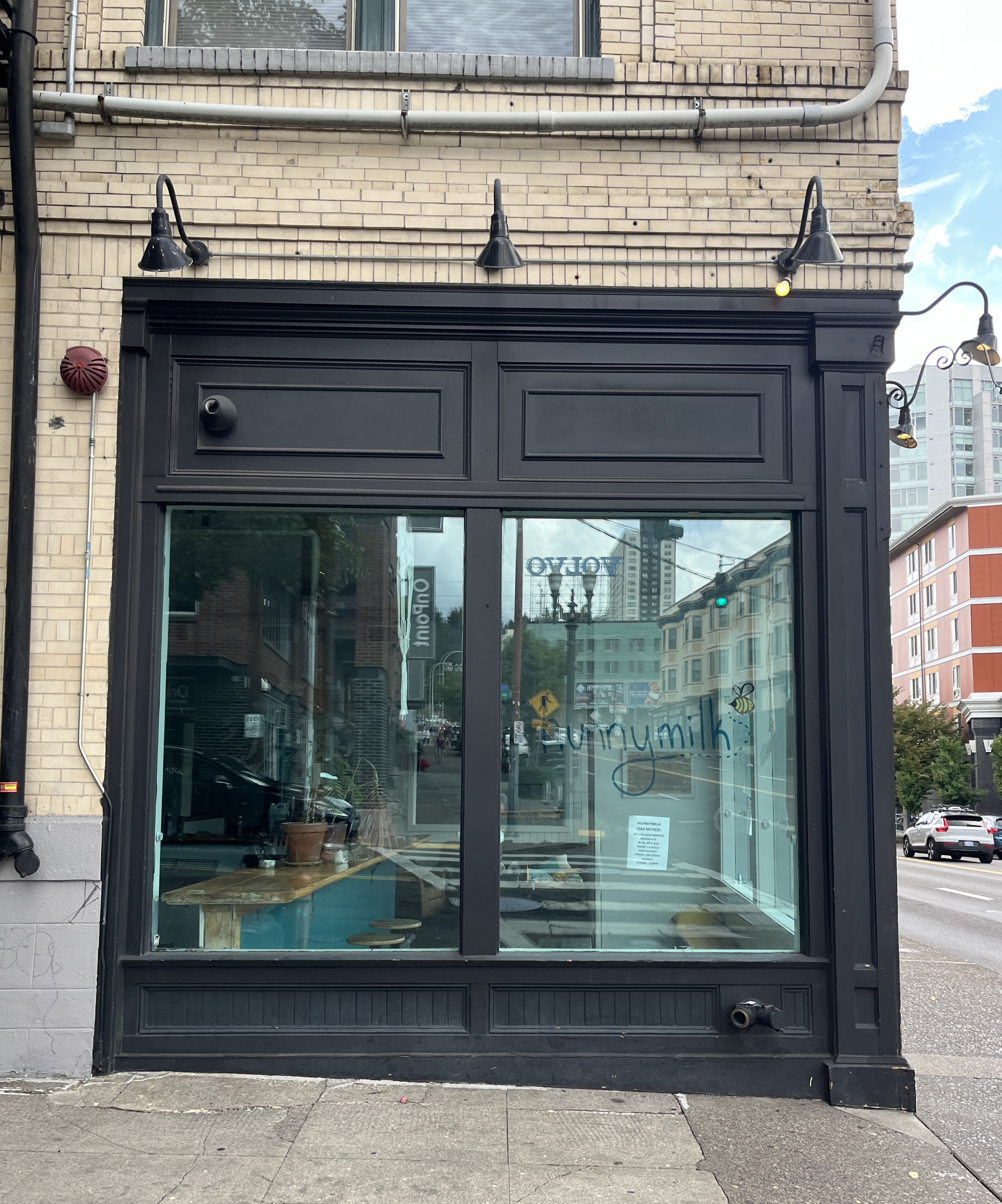
- The restaurant's exterior in 2025
- Interactive map of HunnyMilk

Restaurant information
- Owner: Brandon Weeks
- Chef: Brandon Weeks
- Location: 1981 West Burnside Street, Portland, Multnomah, Oregon, 97209, United States
- Coordinates: 45.5232°N 122.6921°W
- Website: hunnymilk.com

HunnyMilk was a restaurant in Portland, Oregon, United States. Brandon Weeks was the chef and owner. HunnyMilk initially operated as a pop-up restaurant, before relocating to a brick and mortar space on West Burnside Street in northwest Portland's Northwest District in 2018. It garnered a positive reception and closed permanently in June 2026.

== Description ==
The restaurant HunnyMilk operated on West Burnside Street in the Northwest District of northwest Portland. The menu had comfort food such as: biscuits and gravy; a croissant-doughnut sandwich with bacon, fried egg, and cheddar; pork ribs with cheesy grits, carrot cake waffles with honey butter; fortune cookie waffles with vanilla bean mascarpone mousse, and bacon dutch babies. Eater Portland said the restaurant had doughnut-based options such as beignet Benedict with hazelnut pesto and crème fraîche hollandaise and a sourdough pancake doughnut with blueberries and key lime curd ice cream. The Cheezy Herb Biscuit Holes and Chorizo Gravy was a version of biscuits and gravy with Mama Lil’s peppers, scallions, and biscuit "holes". The drink menu included Bloody Marys, mimosas, caramel hot chocolate with marshmallows, coffee by Caffe Umbria, and juice.

== History ==
Brandon Weeks was the chef and owner. HunnyMilk initially operated as a pop-up on weekends, offering "stoner brunches" from La Buca, an Italian restaurant in northeast Portland.

In 2018, HunnyMilk relocated to a brick and mortar space on Burnside Street, opening on September 19. It occupies the space that previously housed Bitter End Pub. The business closed permanently on June 28, 2026.

== Reception ==
Jeremy Pawlowski included HunnyMilk in the Travel Channel's list of Portland's four "must-try" brunch eateries. In her review for Willamette Week, Kiana Pontrelli wrote, "Unless you have a dime to spare and time to kill, HunnyMilk isn't likely to be your go-to weekly breakfast spot. But it's a place to treat yourself and dream of the days you can't. You pay for the sunny atmosphere, the friendly service, the sparkly crayons and coloring sheets at your table and, of course, the delicious brunch. Whether you're seeking the perfect Instagram or the ultimate comfort food, HunnyMilk provides both." She also said the restaurant was best for "stretching brunch into a multihour affair".

Michelle Lopez included the restaurant in Eater Portland's 2018 list of fifteen biscuits in the city "that would make any Southerner proud". 1859 Oregon's Magazine included the business in a 2019 overview of the best eateries for a "bountiful" brunch. The Daily Hive said HunnyMilk started as one of the city's "most desirable pop-up weekend brunch spots" and included the business in a 2021 list of five eateries for "delicious Southern-inspired" biscuits in Portland.

== See also ==
- List of defunct restaurants of the United States
