= Nova PDX =

Event space and former theater in Portland, Oregon, U.S.

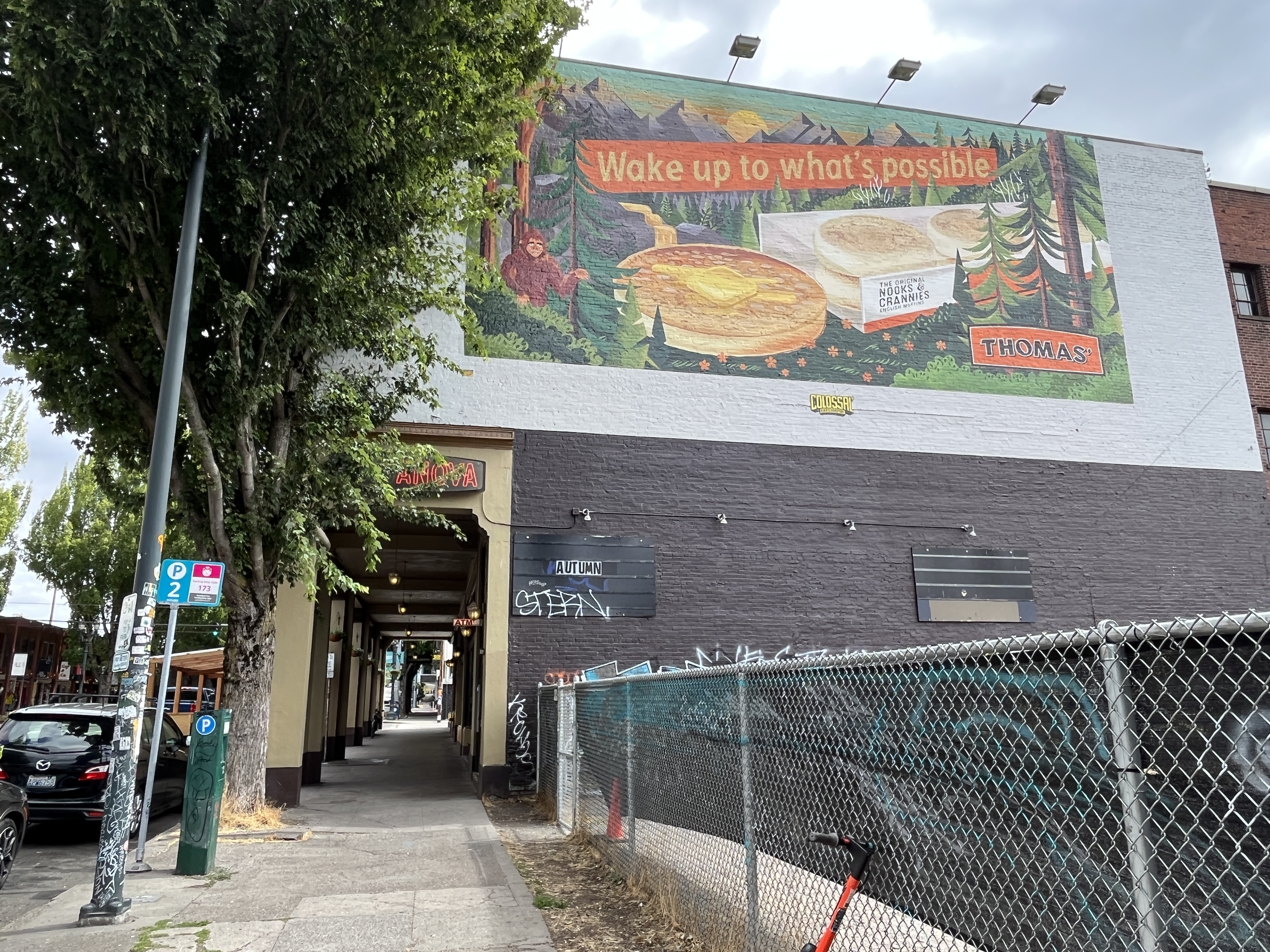
- The venue's exterior in 2022

- Location in Portland, Oregon
- Former names: Bossanova Ballroom
- Address: 722 East Burnside Street
- Location: Portland, Oregon, United States
- Coordinates: 45°31′21.9″N 122°39′29″W

Website
- bossanovaballroom.com

Nova PDX, formerly known as Bossanova Ballroom, is an event space and former theater located at 722 East Burnside Street in Portland, Oregon's Buckman neighborhood, in the United States. It has featured a dance floor, two stages and bars, and a game room. The venue has hosted comedy shows, and the queer event Blow Pony.
