= Burnside Street =

Street in Portland, Oregon, U.S.

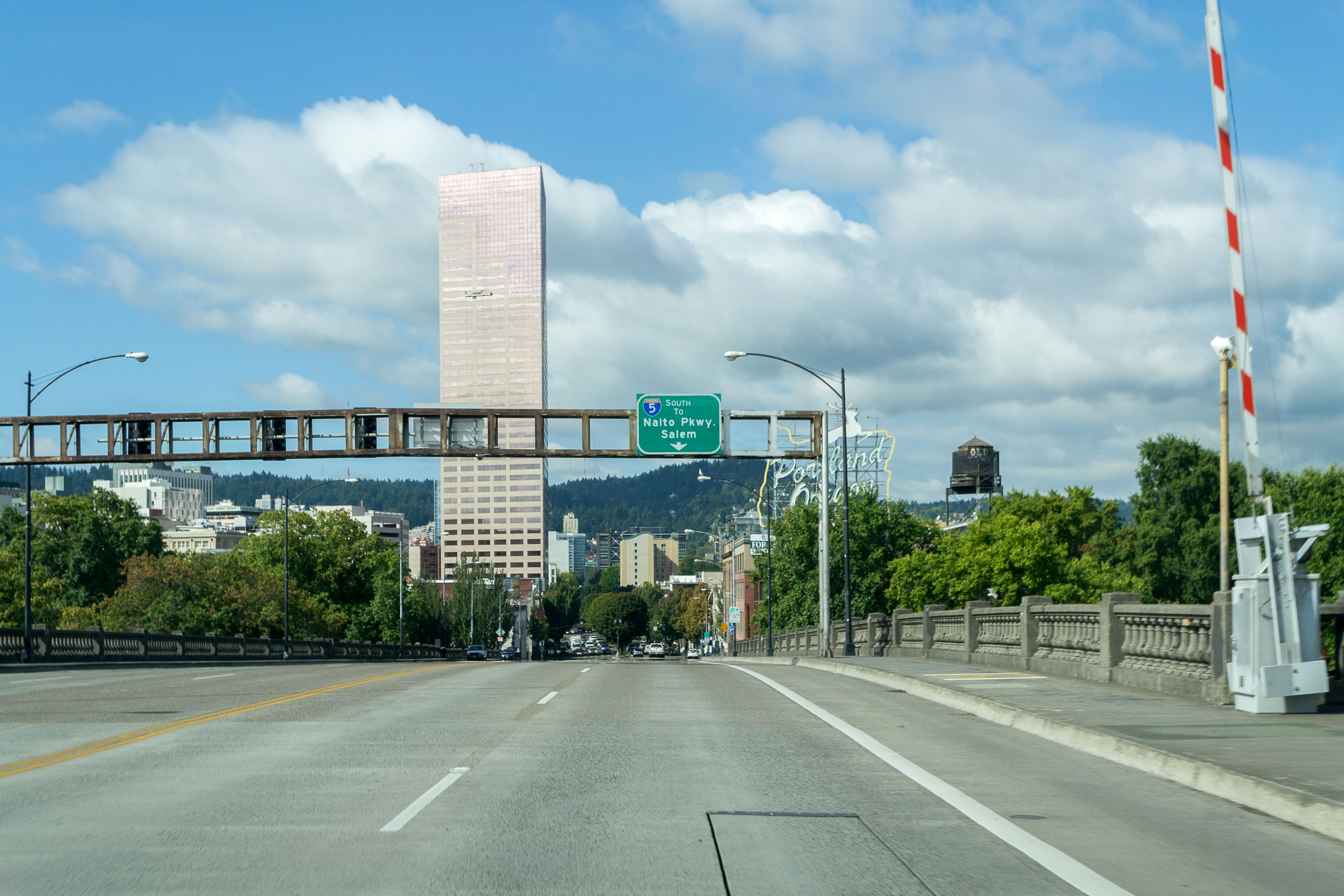
- Facing west on the Burnside Bridge
- Former names: B Street (east of SW 16th); Washington Street (west of SW 16th)
- Owner: Portland Bureau of Transportation west of the east 16100 block; City of Gresham east of east 16100 to Mt. Hood Hwy
- Length: 17.6 mi (28.3 km)
- Location: Portland and Gresham, Oregon, U.S.
- From: Mount Hood Highway
- To: SW Barnes Road

Burnside Street is a major thoroughfare of Portland, in the U.S. state of Oregon, and one of a few east–west streets that runs uninterrupted on both sides of the Willamette River. It serves as the dividing line between North Portland and South Portland. Its namesake bridge, Burnside Bridge, is one of the most heavily traversed in Portland. In Gresham between approximately the east 18300 block to Mt. Hood Hwy (and E Powell Blvd/SE Powell Valley Rd), Burnside runs southeast–northwest and is no longer the divide between northeast and southeast on the City of Portland-Multnomah County street grid. Additionally (as you travel southeast), SE Burnside St becomes NW Burnside Road at SE 202nd/NW Birdsdale Ave, and NE Burnside Rd at N Main Ave in Gresham (later becomes SE Burnside Road at SE 1st Street). Burnside Road's eastern terminus is where it meets Mt. Hood Hwy (US-26), E Powell Blvd (US-26), and SE Powell Valley Road.

== History ==
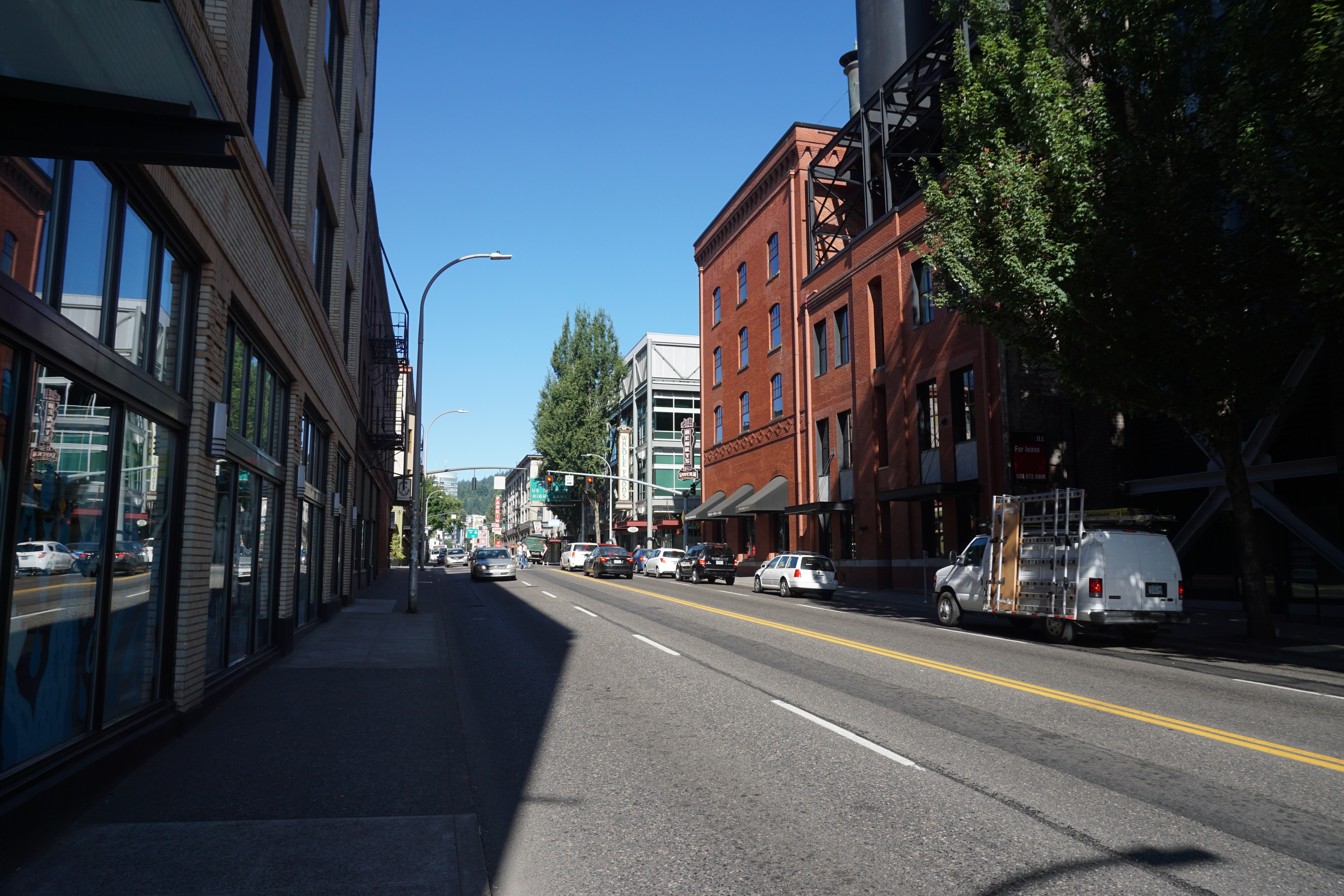
West Burnside Street near Powell's City of Books

What is now Burnside Street was originally named B Street east of Southwest 16th Avenue, Washington Street west of S.W. 16th (as a continuation of Washington Street from downtown) and G Street in East Portland. In 1891, B Street and G Street were renamed for Portland merchant Daniel Wyman Burnside, and in 1933 Washington Street west of SW 16th was renamed Burnside Street. Burnside became Portland's principal east–west axis following the 1912 Bennett Plan, soon becoming one of the widest streets in the city. The street runs from SW Barnes Road in Sylvan-Highlands (starts as W Burnside Road until NW 24th Place) to the Mount Hood Highway in Gresham, a distance of over 17 miles (27 km). It crosses the Willamette River via the Burnside Bridge, where the White Stag sign is visible.

For a number of years, the portion of Burnside between NW 19th Avenue and NE Sandy Boulevard was designated U.S. Route 30. It is served by TriMet bus line 20 between Barnes Road and NE/SE 102nd Avenue, and several MAX Blue Line light-rail stations are located along its route in East Portland between 102nd Avenue and Ruby Junction.

=== Buildings and businesses ===
Notable buildings on Burnside Street include the Crystal Ballroom, Laurelhurst Theater, Nova PDX (formerly Bossanova Ballroom) and the Roseland Theater. Notable businesses that have operated on Burnside include:

- Alexis Restaurant
- Ate-Oh-Ate
- Dante's
- Dimo's Apizza
- Canard
- Doug Fir Lounge
- Franks-A-Lot
- Fifty Licks
- Fire on the Mountain
- Flying Fish Company
- Heart Coffee Roasters
- Hippo Hardware and Trading Company
- HunnyMilk
- Laurelhurst Market
- Le Pigeon
- Lonesome's Pizza
- Mad Greek Deli
- PaaDee
- Pix Pâtisserie
- RingSide Steakhouse
- Rontoms
- Screen Door
- Straight from New York Pizza

The Cart Blocks operate in Ankeny Square on Burnside.

== See also ==
- Barbara Walker Crossing
- United Airlines Flight 173
