= A3 =

A3, A-3, A03 or A.III may refer to:

- A3 paper, a paper size defined by ISO 216

== Arts and media ==
=== Games ===
- A3!, a Japanese video game and multimedia franchise
- A3 - Assault on the Aerie of the Slave Lords, a 1981 module for the Dungeons & Dragons fantasy role-playing game
- Alpha Trion, as the former name of this character from the Transformers Series
- Bird's Opening (A03), in chess, by the Encyclopaedia of Chess Openings code

=== Music ===
- A3, a musical note, the A below Middle C
- Alabama 3, a band known as A3 in the U.S. to avoid confusion with the country group Alabama
- A-3, a Yamaha musical instrument product

== Businesses and organizations ==
=== Military units ===
- Kampfgeschwader 200, a special operations unit in World War II
- Wendes Artillery Regiment, a former Swedish Army artillery regiment, by designation
- A3, the staff designation for air force headquarters staff concerned with operations
  - A3 Air Operations Branch, of the Joint Force Air Component Headquarters UK

=== Other businesses and organizations ===
- Aegean Airlines, by IATA code
- A³ (A-cubed), an Airbus start-up in the Silicon Valley
- A3 (TV channel), an Algerian public national television channel also known as Thalitha TV

== Science and technology ==
=== Biology ===
- A3 regulatory sequence, a sequence for the insulin gene
- Adenosine A_{3} receptor, a human gene
- Annexin A3, a human gene
- ATC code A03 Drugs for functional gastrointestinal disorders, a subgroup of the Anatomical Therapeutic Chemical Classification System
- Brachydactyly type A3, a disease
- British NVC community A3 (Spirodela polyrhiza - Hydrocharis morsus-ranae community), a British Isles plants community
- Gibberellin A3, a plant hormone
- HLA-A3, a Human MHC Serotype HLA-A
- Subfamily A3, a rhodopsin-like receptors subfamily
- Urea transporter A3, a trans-membrane protein

=== Computing ===
- ARITH-MATIC, as the former name for this programming language
- Samsung Galaxy A3, a smartphone manufactured by Samsung Electronics
- Samsung Galaxy A03, a smartphone manufactured by Samsung Electronics
- Cowon A3, an audio media player

=== Vehicles and engines ===
==== Aircraft and aircraft engines ====
- A-3 Falcon, a variant of the Curtiss Falcon, an attack aircraft manufactured by the Curtiss Aircraft Company
- A-3 Skywarrior, a strategic bomber manufactured by Douglas Aircraft Company
- Abrial A-3 Oricou, a French touring aircraft designed in 1927
- Fokker A.III, a 1915 armed version of the Fokker M.5 aircraft
- RED A03, an aircraft diesel engine by German company Red Aviation GmbH

==== Automobiles ====
- Audi A3, a model of automobile
- Chery A3, a compact car

==== Locomotives ====
- Bavarian A III, an 1851 German steam locomotive model
- LNER Gresley Classes A1 and A3, a Pacific locomotive class designed by Sir Nigel Gresley
- SP&S Class A3, a 1914 steam locomotives class

==== Rockets and spacecraft ====
- Aggregate 3, the 3rd design in the Aggregate family of rockets, precursor to the V-2 rocket, developed by the Germans during World War II
- Aussat (Optus) A3, a 1987 Australian telecommunication satellite
- Polaris A-3 missile, an American submarine-launched missile

==== Watercraft ====
- A-3 lifeboat, a 1947 lifeboat carried by the SB-29 Superfortress
- HMS A3, a British A-class submarine of the Royal Navy
- Spanish submarine A-3, an A-class submarine of the Spanish Navy
- USS Grampus (SS-4), a United States Navy Plunger-class submarine renamed A-3 in 1911

=== Other uses in science and technology ===
- A_{3}, an example of a root system with numerous physical and geometrical applications
- AUG A3, a variant of the Austrian Steyr AUG rifle
- A-003, the fourth abort test of the Apollo spacecraft
- C/2023 A3 (Tsuchinshan–ATLAS) , a comet also called A3
- A3 problem solving, a structured problem solving and continuous improvement approach, first employed at Toyota
- Zeolite A-3, a potassium-type molecular sieve also known as 3A
- Lely (company) Astronaut A3, the third version of the Astronaut robot manufactured by Lely

== Sports ==
- A3 (classification), an amputee sport classification
- A3 Champions Cup, a club football tournament also known as the East Asian Champions Cup
- Arrows A3, a 1980 racing car
- Climbing grade A3

== Other uses ==
- A3 paper, a paper size defined by ISO 216
- A3 roads, in several countries
- A-3 visa, a document given to employees of A-1 and A-2 Visa Holders who are representing a foreign government inside the U.S.
- In town and country planning in the United Kingdom, the code for permission to use specific land or premises for restaurants and cafés
- Biu-Mandara A.3 languages, an Afro-Asiatic family of languages spoken in Cameroon and Nigeria
- Tonga, by aircraft registration code
- "Agora! Anarchy! Action!", a slogan for Agorism taken from the New Libertarian Manifesto by Samuel Edward Konkin III

== See also ==
- 3A (disambiguation)
- A-Train III, a 1992 computer game
- M16A3, a variant of the American M16 rifle
- M60A3, a variant of the American M60 Patton tank
- A3J, the original designation of the US Navy's A-5 Vigilante bomber
