= List of Spokane, Portland and Seattle Railway locomotives =

The Spokane, Portland and Seattle Railway (SP&S) used a combination of new and used locomotives. For more information see the SP&S Historical Society Resources.

== Steam locomotives ==
Most of these locomotives were purchased or leased from the SP&S's parent roads Great Northern Railway and Northern Pacific Railway. The 4-8-4 Northerns and 4-6-6-4 Challengers were purchased new. This roster groups steam locomotives by their wheel arrangement and the railroad's designated class.

Image	Class	Wheel arrangement	Quantity	Fleet number(s)	Manufacturer	Serial numbers	Year made	Year(s) retired	Comments
	A-1	0-6-0	5	1–5	Alco (Man.)	44740–44744	1907	1946–1952	Acquired new
	A-2	0-6-0	1	6	Baldwin	8617	1887	1931	ex Astoria & Columbia River 1; exx NP 988, class I; acquired 1911
	A-3	0-6-0	2	7–8	Alco (Schen.)	54403–54404	1914	1952	Acquired new
	L-1	4-4-0	1	50	Schenectady	2785	1889	1928	Ex Columbia River & Northern 2; acquired 1908
	L-2	4-4-0	1	51	Hinkley	1469	1881	1916	Ex Columbia River & Northern 1; acquired 1908
	L-3	4-4-0	1	52	Cooke	1731	1886	1919	Ex Astoria & Columbia River 4; acquired 1911
	L-4	4-4-0	2	53–54	Rogers	3410–3411	1883	1920–1924	Ex Astoria & Columbia River 6–7; acquired 1911
	L-5	4-4-0	2	55–56	Schenectady; Baldwin	4644; 6972	1897; 1883	1915–1930	Acquired 1911, 1915
	D-1	4-6-0	10	100–109	Baldwin	33055…36481	1910	1927–1937	Ex GN 1043–1052, class E-14; acquired 1910. Six rebuilt to class H-1 (1927–1930); remaining four scrapped in 1937
	D-2	4-6-0	2	150–151	Baldwin	36480–36481	1911	1948–1950	Acquired new
	D-3	4-6-0	3	152, 157–158	Schenectady	4703…4710	1898	1938–1941	Ex NP 258, 251, 257; class P. Acquired 1911
	D-4	4-6-0	3	153–155	Cooke	2375–2377	1898	1937–1946	Ex Astoria & Columbia River 16–18. Acquired 1911
	D-5	4-6-0	1	156	Baldwin	23931	1904	1937	Ex Spokane and Inland Empire Railway 2. Acquired 1911
	D-6	4-6-0	1	159	Rogers	5772	1902	1937	Ex Pacific and Eastern 3, exx Great Northern 938, class E-6. Acquired 1912
	D-7	4-6-0	3	160–162	Baldwin	34899–34901	1910	1944	Ex Great Northern 1074–1076, class E-15. Acquired 1925
	M-1	2-6-0	1	200	Baldwin	9546	1888	1928	Ex Northern Pacific 522, class D-3. Acquired 1909
	M-2	2-6-0	1	201	Brooks	2371	1893	1944	Ex Great Northern 420, class D-4. Acquired 1925
	N-4	2-8-0	6	300–305	Baldwin	9507…11949	1888–1891	1937–1945	Ex Northern Pacific class F-1. Acquired 1925
	N-5	2-8-0	1		Baldwin	9524	1888	1937	Ex Northern Pacific 79, class F-1. Acquired 1925
	N-6	2-8-0	5	325–329	Schenectady; Alco (Rich.)	5886…5892; 25826	1901–1902	1945–49	Ex Northern Pacific, class Y-2. Acquired 1925–1936
	N-7	2-8-0	5	335–339	Alco (Schen.)	27350…27358	1903	1945–1946	Ex Northern Pacific, class Y-4. Acquired 1925
	N-1	2-8-0	3	350–352	Brooks	2107…2154	1892	1945–1947	Ex Great Northern, class F-1. Acquired 1908
	N-2	2-8-0	3	355–369	Baldwin; Rogers		1903–1907	1950–1954	Ex Great Northern, class F-8. Acquired 1909–1944
	N-3	2-8-0	1	370	Alco (Pitts.)	29459	1904	1940	Ex Astoria and Columbia River 19. Acquired 1911
	F-1	2-6-2	17	450–466	Baldwin	28851…30999	1906–1907	1937–1949	Ex Great Northern, classes J-2 and J-1s. Acquired 1908–1925
	O-1	2-8-2	14	500–513	Baldwin	39092…49731	1913–1918	1949–1951	Ex Great Northern, class O-1. Acquired 1925–1944
	O-2	2-8-2	1	525	Alco (Schen.)	46878	1910	1947	Ex Northern Pacific 1698, class W-1. Acquired 1925.
	O-3	2-8-2	10	530–539	Alco (Brooks)	52850…57957	1913–1917	1953–1957	Ex Northern Pacific, class W-3. Acquired 1926–1944. No. 539 is preserved.
	O-4	2-8-2	2	550–551	Baldwin	53793…53835	1917	1953	Ex Great Northern, class O-4. Acquired 1950
	C-1	4-4-2	10	600–609	Baldwin	33228…33276	1909	1937–1949	Acquired new. Identical to Great Northern’ class K-1
	H-1	4-6-2	7	620–626			1927–1930 (rebuilt)	1952–1953	Rebuilt from D-1 class locomotives 102–105, 107 and 109 (not in order).
	E-1	4-8-4	3	700–702	Baldwin	62171–62173	1938	1960	Acquired new. Identical to Northern Pacific's class A-3. 700 preserved
	Z-6	4-6-6-4	6	900–905	American	68990–68995	1937	1960	Acquired new. Identical to Northern Pacific's class Z-6. 903 and 904 sold to Great Northern in January 1940, as GN 4000 & 4001, for equalization of GN traffic over the Oregon Trunk. Repurchased in March 1950 and July 1946 respectively.
	Z-8	4-6-6-4	2	910–911	American	71333–71334	1944	1960	Acquired new. Identical to Northern Pacific's class Z-8.

== Diesel locomotives ==
Most of these locomotives were purchased new by the SP&S. Some were, however, purchased second-hand from the Great Northern. The SP&S gained some popularity with railroad fans for its large proportion of diesels manufactured by Alco. For detailed info see John Gaertner's book or SP&S Historical Society

Image	Model	hp	Quantity	Built	Road numbers	Notes
	ALCO S-1	600	2	1941	10–11	Acquired new.
	ALCO S-2	1000	9	1940–1943	20–28	Acquired new.
	Baldwin VO-1000	1000	5	1940–1945	30–34	30-31 ex-demo. 32-34 Acquired new.
	EMD NW2	1000	3	1948	40–42	Acquired new.
	EMD SW9	1200	3	1951	43–45	Acquired new.
	ALCO RS-1	1000	2	1945	50–51	Acquired new.
	ALCO RS-1	1000	4	1945	52–55	Ex Oregon Electric 52–55, acquired 1951
	ALCO RS-2	1500	3	1949–1950	60–62	Acquired new. Steam generators from 800–802.
	ALCO RS-2	1500	2	1947	63–64	Ex Great Northern 200–201, acquired 1963
	ALCO RS-3	1600	18	1950–1953	65–82	Acquired new. Phase 1 body style
	ALCO RS-3	1600	2	1953	83–84	Ex GN 231–232, acquired 1959
	ALCO RS-3	1600	9	1955	90–98	Acquired new. Phase 3 body style
	ALCO C-415	1500	2	1968	100–101	Acquired new.
	EMD GP9	1750	6	1956	150–155	Acquired new. 150-153 Steam generators Phase 2 body style
	ALCO C-424	2400	7	1964	300–306	Acquired new.
	ALCO C-425	2500	8	1965	310–317	Acquired new.
	ALCO C-425	2500	8	1966	320–327	Acquired new.
	ALCO C-636	3600	6	1967	330–335	Acquired new.
	ALCO C-636	3600	4	1968	340–343	Acquired new.
	EMD E7A	2000	1	1948	750	Acquired new.
	EMD F3A	1500	2	1947	800A1–800A2	Acquired new. Renumbered 800–801. Original steam generators were too small. Replaced with larger ones; old ones installed into 60–62
	EMD F3A	1500	1	1948	802	Acquired new.
	EMD F7A	1500	4	1953	803–806	Acquired new. 804 is preserved.
	ALCO FA-1	1500	6	1948	850A1,A2–852A1,A2	Acquired new. Renumbered 850–855
	ALCO FA-1	1500	6	1949	858A1,A2–860A1,A2 (eve.n nos.)	Acquired new. Renumbered 856–861
	ALCO FA-1	1500	4	1948	862A1,A2, 864A1,A2	Ex GN 440A,D, 442A,D. Renumbered 862–865
	ALCO FA-1	1500	2	1950	866A1,A2	Acquired new. Renumbered 866–867
	ALCO FA-2	1600	2	1950	868A1,A2	Acquired new. Renumbered 868–869
	ALCO FB-1	1500	6	1949	856B1,B2–860B1,B2 (even nos.)	Acquired new. Renumbered 200–205
	ALCO FB-1	1500	4	1948	862B1,B2, 864B1,B2	Ex GN 440B,C, 442B,C. Renumbered 206–209
	ALCO FB-1	1500	2	1950	866B1,B2	Acquired new. Renumbered 210–211
	ALCO FB-2	1600	2	1950	868B1,B2	Acquired new. Renumbered 212–213
	EMD GP38	2000	6	1970	200–205 (2nd)	Ordered by the SP&S, but delivered to Burlington Northern after the merger.
