= List of highways numbered 3 =

The following highways are numbered 3, H-3, PRI-3, AH3, E03 and R3. For roads numbered A3, see A3 roads. For roads numbered M3, see M3. For roads numbered N3, see N3. For roads numbered 3A, see 3A.

== International ==
- AH3 Asian Highway 3
- E03 European route E03
- E003 European route E003
- Tripoli – Cape Town Highway

== Albania ==
- A3 motorway (Albania)
- SH-3 Road in Albania from Kapshtice to Tirana.

== Argentina ==
- National Route 3

== Australia ==
=== New South Wales ===
- A3 (Sydney)

=== Northern Territory ===
- (Northern Territory)

=== Queensland ===
- M3/A3 (Brisbane)
- Burnett Highway (Queensland)
- State Route 3 (Queensland) – Isis Highway

=== South Australia ===
- Cross Road

=== Tasmania ===
- Tasman Highway

=== Victoria ===
  - Eastern Freeway (Melbourne)
  - EastLink (Melbourne) (Toll)
  - Frankston Freeway
  - Nepean Highway

=== Western Australia ===
- State Route 3 (Western Australia) – Reid Highway and Roe Highway

== Austria ==
- Südost Autobahn

== Belgium ==
- R3 (ring road)

== Bolivia ==
- National Route 3 (Bolivia)

== Bulgaria ==
- Републикански път I-3
- Struma motorway (A3/E79)

== Myanmar ==
- National Highway 3 (Myanmar)

== Cambodia ==
- National Highway 3 (Cambodia)

== Canada ==
- Alberta Highway 3 (Crowsnest Highway)
- British Columbia Highway 3 (Crowsnest Highway)
- Manitoba Highway 3
- New Brunswick Route 3
- Newfoundland and Labrador Route 3
- Nova Scotia Trunk 3
- Ontario Highway 3
- Prince Edward Island Route 3
- Quebec Route 3 (former)
- Saskatchewan Highway 3
- Yellowknife Highway (Northwest Territories Highway 3)
- Yukon Highway 3

== China ==
- G3 Expressway

== Costa Rica ==
- National Route 3

== Cuba ==
- Autopista A3
- Highway I–3
  - Highway 1–I–3
  - Highway 2–I–3
  - Highway 3–I–3
  - Highway 4–I–3

== Czech Republic ==
- D3 motorway
- I/3 Highway (in Czech)

== Djibouti ==
- RN-3 (Djibouti)

== Dominican Republic ==
- DR-3

== Estonia ==
Estonian national road 3

== Eswatini ==
- MR3 road

== Finland ==
- Vt 3 Finnish national road 3
- Åland Islands Highway 3

== Germany ==
- A 3 Bundesautobahn 3
- B 3 Bundesstraße 3

== Greece ==
- A3 motorway (also known as the E65 motorway)
- EO3 road

== Hong Kong ==
- Route 3 (Hong Kong)

== Hungary ==
- M3 motorway (Hungary)
- Main road 3 (Hungary)

== India ==
- National Highway 3 (India)
- National Highway 3 (India, old numbering)

== Indonesia ==
- Indonesian National Route 3

== Iran ==
- Freeway 3 (Iran)

== Iraq ==
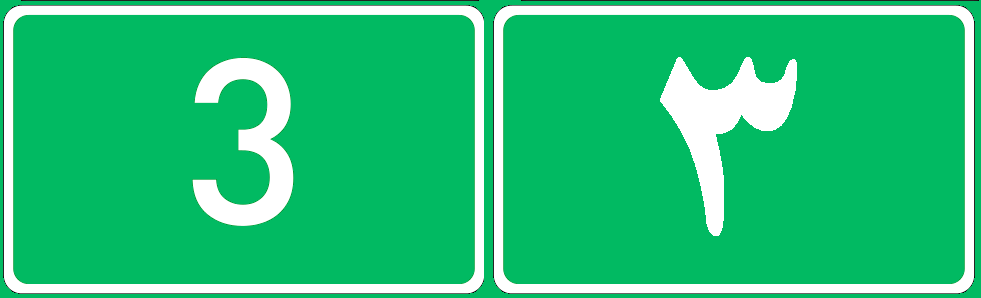
- Highway 3 (Iraq)

== Ireland ==
- M3 motorway (Republic of Ireland)
- N3 road (Ireland)

== Israel ==
- Highway 3 (Israel)

== Italy ==
- Autostrada A3
- RA 3

== Japan ==
- National Route 3
- Kyushu Expressway
  - Minamikyushu Expressway (branch of the Kyushu Expressway)
- Route 3 (Shuto Expressway) in the Shibuya area of Tokyo
- Route 3 (Nagoya Expressway)
- Kobe Route

== Kazakhstan ==
- A3 highway (Kazakhstan)

== Korea, South ==
- National Route 35

== Laos ==
- R3A highway

== Malaysia ==
- Second Link Expressway
- FT 3 Malaysia Federal Route 3
- J3 Kempas Highway, Jalan Datin Halimah
- M3 Malacca State Route M3 (Jalan Datuk Wira Poh Ah Tiam, Jalan Lorong Pandan)

== Mexico ==
- Mexican Federal Highway 3

== Moldova ==
- Magistrala 3
- Road 3

== New Zealand ==
- New Zealand State Highway 3
  - New Zealand State Highway 3A

== Nigeria ==
- A3 highway (Nigeria)

== Oman ==
- Route 3 (Oman)

== Paraguay ==
- National Route 3

== Philippines ==
- C-3 Circumferential Road 3
- R-3 Radial Road 3
- N3 highway (Philippines)
- E3 expressway (Philippines)

== Poland ==
- A 3 Autostrada A3 (planned 1993-2001; unbuilt)
- S 3 Expressway S3
- DK 3 National road 3

== Romania ==
- Drumul Naţional 3
- Autostrada A3

== Russia ==
- M3 highway (Russia)

== Sri Lanka ==
- A3 Colombo-Puttalam Road
- E03 Colombo–Katunayake Expressway

== South Africa ==
- N3 (South Africa)
- M3 (Cape Town)
- M3 (Pretoria)

== Taiwan (Republic of China) ==
- Freeway 3 (Taiwan)
- Provincial Highway 3 (Taiwan)

== Thailand ==
- Thailand Route 3 (Sukhumvit Road)

== Turkey ==
- O-3, a motorway in Turkey running from Edirne to Istanbul.

== United Kingdom ==
- M3 motorway (Great Britain)
- A3 road (Great Britain)
- M3 motorway (Northern Ireland)
- A3 road (Northern Ireland)

== United States ==
- Interstate 3 (former proposal)
- Interstate A-3 (unsigned)
- Interstate H-3
- Interstate PR-3 (unsigned)
- U.S. Route 3
- New England Interstate Route 3 (former)
- Alabama State Route 3
  - County Route 3 (Lee County, Alabama)
- Alaska Route 3
- Arkansas Highway 3
- California State Route 3
  - County Route A3 (California)
  - County Route D3 (California)
  - County Route E3 (California)
  - County Route G3 (California)
  - County Route J3 (California)
  - County Route N3 (California)
  - County Route R3 (California)
  - County Route S3 (California)
- Colorado State Highway 3
- Connecticut Route 3
- Delaware Route 3
- Florida State Road 3
  - Florida State Road 3A (pre-1945) (former)
  - County Road 3 (Brevard County, Florida)
  - County Road 3 (Volusia County, Florida)
- Georgia State Route 3
  - Georgia State Route 3N (former)
  - Georgia State Route 3S (Thomaston) (former)
  - Georgia State Route 3W (Albany 1946–1957) (former)
  - Georgia State Route 3W (Albany 1960–1973) (former)
  - Georgia State Route 3W (Thomaston) (former)
  - Georgia State Route 3W (Atlanta–Marietta 1937–1946) (former)
  - Georgia State Route 3W (Atlanta–Marietta 1954–1955) (former)
  - Georgia State Route 3E (Thomaston) (former)
  - Georgia State Route 3E (Atlanta–Marietta) (former)
- Idaho State Highway 3
- Illinois Route 3
- Indiana State Road 3
- Iowa Highway 3
- K-3 (Kansas highway)
- Kentucky Route 3
- Louisiana Highway 3
  - Louisiana State Route 3 (former)
- Maine State Route 3
- Maryland Route 3
- Massachusetts Route 3
- M-3 (Michigan highway)
- Minnesota State Highway 3
  - County Road 3 (Anoka County, Minnesota)
  - County Road 3 (Chisago County, Minnesota)
  - County Road 3 (Goodhue County, Minnesota)
  - County Road 3 (Hennepin County, Minnesota)
  - County Road 3 (Ramsey County, Minnesota)
  - County Road 3 (St. Louis County, Minnesota)
- Mississippi Highway 3
- Missouri Route 3
  - Missouri Route 3 (1922) (former)
- Montana Highway 3
- Nebraska Highway 3 (former)
- Nevada State Route 3 (former)
- New Jersey Route 3
  - County Route 3 (Monmouth County, New Jersey)
    - County Route 3A (Monmouth County, New Jersey)
  - County Route 3 (Ocean County, New Jersey)
- New York State Route 3
  - New York State Route 3A (1930–1932) (former)
  - New York State Route 3A (1932–1935) (former)
  - New York State Route 3B (1930–1932) (former)
  - New York State Route 3B (1932–1935) (former)
  - New York State Route 3C (1930–1932) (former)
  - New York State Route 3C (1932–1935) (former)
  - New York State Route 3D (1931–1932) (former)
  - New York State Route 3D (1932–1935) (former)
  - New York State Route 3E (1930–1932) (former)
  - New York State Route 3E (1932–1935) (former)
  - New York State Route 3F (1931–1932) (former)
  - New York State Route 3F (1932–1935) (former)
  - New York State Route 3G (former)
  - County Route 3 (Allegany County, New York)
  - County Route 3 (Cattaraugus County, New York)
  - County Route 3 (Chemung County, New York)
  - County Route 3 (Dutchess County, New York)
  - County Route 3 (Genesee County, New York)
  - County Route 3 (Greene County, New York)
  - County Route 3 (Jefferson County, New York)
  - County Route 3 (Livingston County, New York)
  - County Route 3 (Montgomery County, New York)
  - County Route 3 (Niagara County, New York)
  - County Route 3 (Oneida County, New York)
  - County Route 3 (Ontario County, New York)
  - County Route 3 (Oswego County, New York)
  - County Route 3 (Otsego County, New York)
  - County Route 3 (Rensselaer County, New York)
  - County Route 3 (Schoharie County, New York)
  - County Route 3 (Schuyler County, New York)
  - County Route 3 (St. Lawrence County, New York)
  - County Route 3 (Steuben County, New York)
  - County Route 3 (Suffolk County, New York)
  - County Route 3 (Westchester County, New York)
- North Carolina Highway 3
- North Dakota Highway 3
- Ohio State Route 3
- Oklahoma State Highway 3
  - Oklahoma State Highway 3E
  - Oklahoma State Highway 3W
- Oregon Route 3
- Pennsylvania Route 3
- Rhode Island Route 3
- South Carolina Highway 3
- Tennessee State Route 3
- Texas State Highway 3
  - Texas State Highway Loop 3 (former)
  - Texas State Highway Spur 3
  - Texas Farm to Market Road 3
  - Texas Park Road 3
- Utah State Route 3 (former)
- Vermont Route 3
- Virginia State Route 3
- Washington State Route 3
  - Primary State Highway 3 (Washington) (former)
- West Virginia Route 3

=== Territories ===
- Guam Highway 3
- Interstate PR-3 (unsigned)
- Puerto Rico Highway 3
  - Puerto Rico Highway 3R

== Uruguay ==
- Route 3 Gral. José Artigas

== Zambia ==
- T3 road (Zambia)
- M3 road (Zambia)

== See also ==
- List of highways numbered 3A
- List of highways numbered 3B
- List of highways numbered 3C
- List of highways numbered 3E
- List of highways numbered 3G

| Preceded by 2 | Lists of highways 3 | Succeeded by 4 |
