= 3A =

3A, 3-A or III-A may refer to:

- 3A (Band), a German pop band
- Long March 3A, a Chinese rocket
- Northern Nevada 3A Region, a part of the Nevada Interscholastic Athletics Association governing the northern half of Nevada for high school athletics
- Route 3A (disambiguation)
- Stalag III-A, a German prisoner of war camp
- Zeolite 3A, a potassium-type molecular sieve
- Google Pixel 3a, a mid-range smartphone manufactured by Google
- Grade A tertiary hospital

== See also ==
- A3 (disambiguation)
