= Samsung Galaxy M04 =

2022 entry-level smartphone by Samsung Electronics

- Brand: Samsung
- Manufacturer: Samsung Electronics
- Type: Smartphone
- Series: Galaxy M
- Family: Samsung Galaxy
- First released: 10 December 2022; 3 years ago
- Availability by region: 16 December 2022; 3 years ago
- Predecessor: Samsung Galaxy M02
- Successor: Samsung Galaxy M05
- Related: Samsung Galaxy A04
- Compatible networks: 2G / 3G / 4G
- Form factor: Slate
- Colors: Sea Glass Green, Shadow Blue
- Operating system: Android 12 with One UI Core 4.1
- System-on-chip: Mediatek MT6765 Helio P35 (12nm)
- CPU: Octa-core (4x2.35 GHz Cortex-A53 & 4x1.8 GHz Cortex-A53)
- GPU: PowerVR GE8320
- Memory: 4 GB RAM
- Storage: 64 and 128 GB
- Removable storage: microSDXC
- SIM: Nano-SIM
- Battery: Li-Po 5000 mAh
- Charging: Fast charging 15W
- Rear camera: 13 MP, f/2.2, (wide), AF; 2 MP, f/2.4, (depth); LED flash 1080p@30fps
- Front camera: 5 MP, f/2.2 1080p@30fps
- Display: 6.5 in (170 mm); Infinity-V Display, PLS LCD; 720 x 1600 px resolution, 20:9 ratio (~270 ppi density)
- External display: None
- Sound: Yes
- Connectivity: Wi-Fi 802.11 b/g/n Bluetooth 5.0, A2DP, LE
- Data inputs: Multi-touch screen; USB Type-C 2.0; Accelerometer; Proximity sensor
- Water resistance: None
- Model: SM-M045F, SM-M045F/DS

The Samsung Galaxy M04 is an entry-level Android-based smartphone manufactured, designed, marketed and developed by Samsung Electronics, as part of the Galaxy M series. It was announced on 10 December 2022, and released on 16 December 2022. It shares similarities to the Samsung Galaxy A04e.
