= List of highways numbered 3C =

The following highways are numbered 3C:

== United States ==
- New York State Route 3C (former)
- Nevada State Route 3C (former)

== See also ==
- List of highways numbered 3
