= N3 =

N3 may refer to:

== Roads ==
- N3 (Bangladesh), connecting Dhaka and Mymensingh
- N3 road (Belgium), one of the national roads in Belgium
- National Road 3 (Democratic Republic of the Congo)
- N3 road (Gabon)
- N3 road (Ghana)
- N3 road (Ireland), a National Primary Route
- N3 motorway (Netherlands), one of the national roads in the Netherlands
- N3 road (Oman)
- N3 road (Senegal), one of the national roads in Senegal
- N3 (South Africa), a road connecting Johannesburg to Durban
- Route nationale 3, France

== Transportation ==
- N3-class battleship, a Royal Navy battleship design that was never built
- USS N-3 (SS-55), a 1915 coastal defense submarine of the US Navy
- SP&S Class N-3, a steam locomotives class from the Spokane, Portland and Seattle Locomotive Roster
- N_{3}, gauges for monitoring a third section in a triple spool jet engine
- N3, IATA code for the Russian airline Omskavia
- N3, European large goods vehicles above 12 tonnes
- N3 Pup - the Preceptor N3 Pup ultralight aircraft (and derivatives)
- Huanghai N3, a midsize pickup truck

== Science and technology ==
- Haplogroup N (Y-DNA), a former human Y-chromosomal haplogroup, now N1c
- n-3, Omega-3 fatty acid
- Trinitrogen (N_{3}), inorganic molecule composed of three nitrogen atoms
- N^{−}_{3}, an azide anion in chemistry
- N^{3−}, a nitride anion in chemistry
- N3 Lung cancer, metastasis to certain lymph nodes
- N_{3}, the genus three non orientable surface
- N3, cis-bis(isothiocyanato)bis(2,2'-bipyridyl-4,4'-dicarboxylato)ruthenium(II), a red dye in dye-sensitized solar cells
- N3, abbreviation for the 3 nanometer process node in semiconductor technology

== Other ==
- N3 (Calgary), condominium building
- N3 (NHS), the national broadband network for the English National Health Service
- Notation3, or N3 rules, a textual notation for the Resource Description Framework
- N3, the third level of the Japanese-Language Proficiency Test
- N3, the most recent version of the Nagravision conditional access system for cable and satellite television
- N3, a postcode district in the N postcode area in London
- N3, the former name of NDR Fernsehen, a German television channel

== See also ==
- N03, the ICD-10 code for Nephritic syndrome
- ATC code N03, Antiepileptics, a subgroup of the Anatomical Therapeutic Chemical Classification System
- 3N (disambiguation)
- List of highways numbered 3
- N road (disambiguation)
