= Samsung Galaxy A01 =

2020 entry-level smartphone by Samsung Electronics

Samsung Galaxy A01 Samsung Galaxy M01 Samsung Galaxy A01 Core Samsung Galaxy M01 Core Samsung Galaxy A3 Core
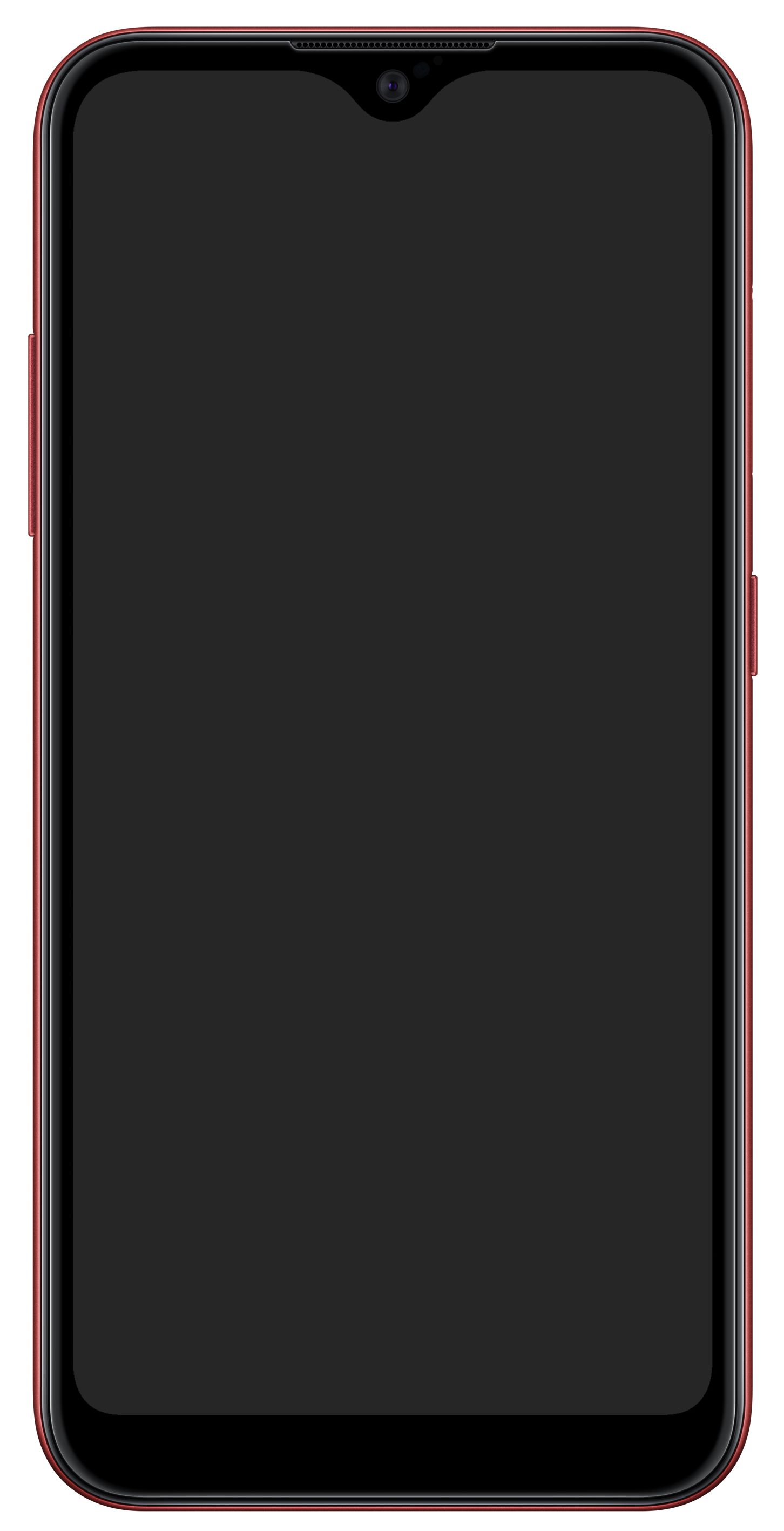
- Brand: Samsung
- Manufacturers: Samsung Electronics; Huaqin Telecom
- Type: Smartphone
- Series: Galaxy A/Galaxy M
- Family: Samsung Galaxy
- First released: A01: December 2019; 6 years ago M01: June 2020; 6 years ago
- Availability by region: A01: January 24, 2020; 6 years ago M01: June 2020; 6 years ago
- Successor: Samsung Galaxy A02; Samsung Galaxy A02s
- Related: Samsung Galaxy A11; Samsung Galaxy A21; Samsung Galaxy A21s; Samsung Galaxy A31; Samsung Galaxy A41; Samsung Galaxy A51; Samsung Galaxy A71
- Dimensions: 146.3 mm (5.76 in) H 70.86 mm (2.790 in) W 8.34 mm (0.328 in) D
- Weight: 151 g (5.3 oz)
- Operating system: Original: Android 10 with One UI Core 2.0; Current: Android 12 with One UI Core 4.0
- System-on-chip: Qualcomm Snapdragon 439 (12 nm); Mediatek MT6739 (28nm) (Core)
- CPU: Octa-core (4x1.95 GHz Cortex-A53 & 4x1.45 GHz Cortex A53); Quad-core (4x1.5GHz Cortex-A53) (Core)
- GPU: Adreno 505; PowerVR GE8100 (Core)
- Memory: 1, 2, 3 GB RAM
- Storage: 16/32 GB internal storage
- Removable storage: microSD (Up to 512 GB)
- SIM: Nano-SIM (4FF)
- Battery: A01: 3000 mAh; M01: 4000 mAh
- Charging: 5W
- Rear camera: 13 MP + 2 MP
- Front camera: 5 MP
- Display: 5.7 in. PLS TFT LCD, 720x1520 HD+
- Connectivity: Wi-Fi 802.11 b/g/n, Bluetooth 4.2
- Data inputs: Micro-USB (Global), USB-C (USA)
- Model: SM-A015x (last letter varies by carrier and international models)
- SAR: Blist; 0.35 W/kg (head); 1.56 W/kg (body)
- Website: Galaxy A01

The Samsung Galaxy A01 is a budget Android-based smartphone manufactured and developed by Samsung Electronics and Huaqin Telecom, as part of its Galaxy A series. The phone was announced on December 17, 2019. It is the first phone under the Galaxy A0x lineup.

A rebranded variant of this device, the Galaxy M01, was first announced on June 2, 2020, which shares some of the features with the Galaxy A01 (but has 3GB of RAM, drops the 16GB storage option and has a bigger 4000mAh battery).

A Core variant of this device was also announced on July 21, 2020. It was also known as the Galaxy M01 Core for India, and Galaxy A3 Core for Africa.

== Specifications ==
=== Design ===
Both devices feature a plastic frame and back panel, with a glass front display. The A01/M01 features a matte back design, while the Core variants feature a ripple pattern.

Galaxy A01 Galaxy M01	Galaxy A01 Core Galaxy M01 Core Galaxy A3 Core
Black; Blue; Red

=== Hardware ===
==== Display ====
The A01/M01 features a 5.7 in PLS TFT display with an HD+ resolution (720 x 1520) and an aspect ratio of 19:9, while the Core variants feature a 5.3 in PLS TFT display with an HD+ resolution (720 x 1480) and an aspect ratio of 18:9.

==== Cameras ====
The A01/M01 has a dual-camera setup arranged vertically on the left side of the phones along with the flash. The main camera is a 13 MP wide lens and the second is a 2 MP depth sensor. The main camera can record video up at 1080p @ 30 fps. A single 5 MP front-facing camera is present in a notch.

The Core variants feature a single 8 MP rear lens and a 5 MP front camera.

==== Processor and memory ====
The A01/M01 is powered by the octa-core Qualcomm Snapdragon 439. Storage options are either 16 GB or 32 GB as well as 2 GB or 3 GB of RAM. It can be expanded via microSD up to 512 GB.

The Core variants are powered by the quad-core MediaTek MT6739. Storage options are either 16 GB or 32 GB as well as 1 GB or 2 GB of RAM. It can be expanded via microSD up to 512 GB.

==== Battery ====
The A01 and all of its Core variants have a non-removable 3000 mAh battery, while the M01's battery has a capacity of 4000 mAh.

=== Software ===
All devices have Android 10 with One UI Core 2.0 pre-installed. It was eligible for 2 OS upgrades and 4 years of security updates.
