= 3N =

3N or 3-N may refer to:

- 3rd parallel north latitude
- Air Urga's IATA code
- F6F-3N, a model of Grumman F6F Hellcat
- F7F-3N, a model of Grumman F7F Tigercat
- P-3N, a model of Lockheed P-3 Orion
- 8A-3N, a model if Northrop A-17
- Routine 3N Incidents, see Incident (Scientology)

== Film ==
- No Nut November, a 2008 South African film

== See also ==
- N3 (disambiguation)
