= Utah State Route 3 =

State Route 3

Location
- Country: United States
- State: Utah

Highway system
- Utah State Highway System; Interstate; US; State; Minor; Scenic
← SR-2	→ SR-4

Utah State Route 3 may refer to:

- Utah State Route 3 (1962-1977), the former state highway designation (legislative overlay) for most of Interstate 80N (except its concurrency with Interstate 15)--now designated as Interstate 84--in Utah, United States, which runs through Box Elder, Weber, Morgan, and Summit counties
- Utah State Route 3 (1920s-1962), a former state highway in Rich County, Utah, United States, that consisted mostly of what is now Utah State Route 16 and the section of what is now Utah State Route 30 from its junction with Utah State Route 16 (Sage Creek Junction) to Garden City; and it was also former state highway designation (legislative overlay) for the section of U.S. Route 89 that runs north from Garden City to the Idaho state line

== See also ==
- List of state highways in Utah
- List of Interstate Highways in Utah
- List of U.S. Highways in Utah
- List of named highway junctions in Utah
- List of highways numbered 3
