= List of highways numbered 3G =

The following highways are numbered 3G:

== United States ==
- New York State Route 3G (former)
- Secondary State Highway 3G (Washington) (former)

== See also ==
- List of highways numbered 3
