= Utah State Route 2 =

State Route 2

Location
- Country: United States
- State: Utah

Highway system
- Utah State Highway System; Interstate; US; State; Minor; Scenic
← SR-1	→ SR-3

Utah State Route 2 may refer to:

- Utah State Route 2 (1962-1977), the former state highway designation (legislative overlay) for most of Interstate 80 (except its concurrency with Interstate 15) in Utah, United States, which runs through Tooele, Salt Lake, and Summit counties
- Utah State Route 2 (1920s-1962), a former state highway designation (legislative overlay) for a section of U.S. Route 89 in Cache and Rich counties in Utah, United States, that ran from Logan to Garden City

== See also ==
- List of state highways in Utah
- List of Interstate Highways in Utah
- List of named highway junctions in Utah
- List of highways numbered 2
