= Utah State Route 1 =

State Route 1

Location
- Country: United States
- State: Utah

Highway system
- Utah State Highway System; Interstate; US; State; Minor; Scenic
| ← SR-901 | → SR-2 |

Utah State Route 1 may refer to:

- Utah State Route 1 (1962-1977), the former state highway designation (legislative overlay) for Interstate 15 in Utah, United States, the primary north–south transportation route in the state (and runs through Washington, Iron, Beaver, Millard, Juab, Utah, Salt Lake, Davis, Weber, and Box Elder counties)
- Utah State Route 1 (1920s-1962), the former state highway designation (legislative overlay) for U.S. Route 91 in Utah, United States, that (before it was substantially truncated in 1974) ran north–south through the length of the state and was (prior to the construction of Interstate 15) the primary north–south transportation route in the state (and ran through Washington, Iron, Beaver, Millard, Juab, Utah, Salt Lake, Davis, Weber, Box Elder, and Cache counties)

== See also ==
- List of state highways in Utah
- List of Interstate Highways in Utah
- List of U.S. Highways in Utah
- List of named highway junctions in Utah
- List of highways numbered 1
