= Utah State Route 4 =

State Route 4

Location
- Country: United States
- State: Utah

Highway system
- Utah State Highway System; Interstate; US; State; Minor; Scenic
← SR-3	→ SR-5

Utah State Route 4 may refer to:

- Utah State Route 4 (1962-1977), the former state highway designation (legislative overlay) for Interstate 70 in Utah, United States, which runs through Millard, Sevier, Emery, and Grand counties
- Utah State Route 4 (1920s-1962), the former state highway designation (and some cases legislative overlay) for the multiple roads along what is now roughly the corridor for Interstate 80 in Utah, United States, that ran through Tooele, Salt Lake, and Summit counties

== See also ==
- List of state highways in Utah
- List of Interstate Highways in Utah
- List of U.S. Highways in Utah
- List of named highway junctions in Utah
- List of highways numbered 4
