= Utah State Route 5 =

State Route 5

Location
- Country: United States
- State: Utah

Highway system
- Utah State Highway System; Interstate; US; State; Minor; Scenic
← SR-4	→ SR-6

Utah State Route 5 may refer to:

- Utah State Route 5 (1962-1977), the former state highway designation (legislative overlay) for Interstate 215 in Salt Lake County, Utah, United States
- Utah State Route 5 (1910-1962), the former state highway designation (and mostly legislative overlay) for several roads along what is now a section of U.S. Route 89 and roughly a section of the corridor for Interstate 84 in Weber, Morgan, and Summit counties in Utah, United States, that ran from Ogden to Echo Junction

== See also ==
- List of state highways in Utah
- List of Interstate Highways in Utah
- List of U.S. Highways in Utah
- List of named highway junctions in Utah
- List of highways numbered 5
