= Spokane, Portland and Seattle 539 =

Preserved American 2-8-2 locomotive

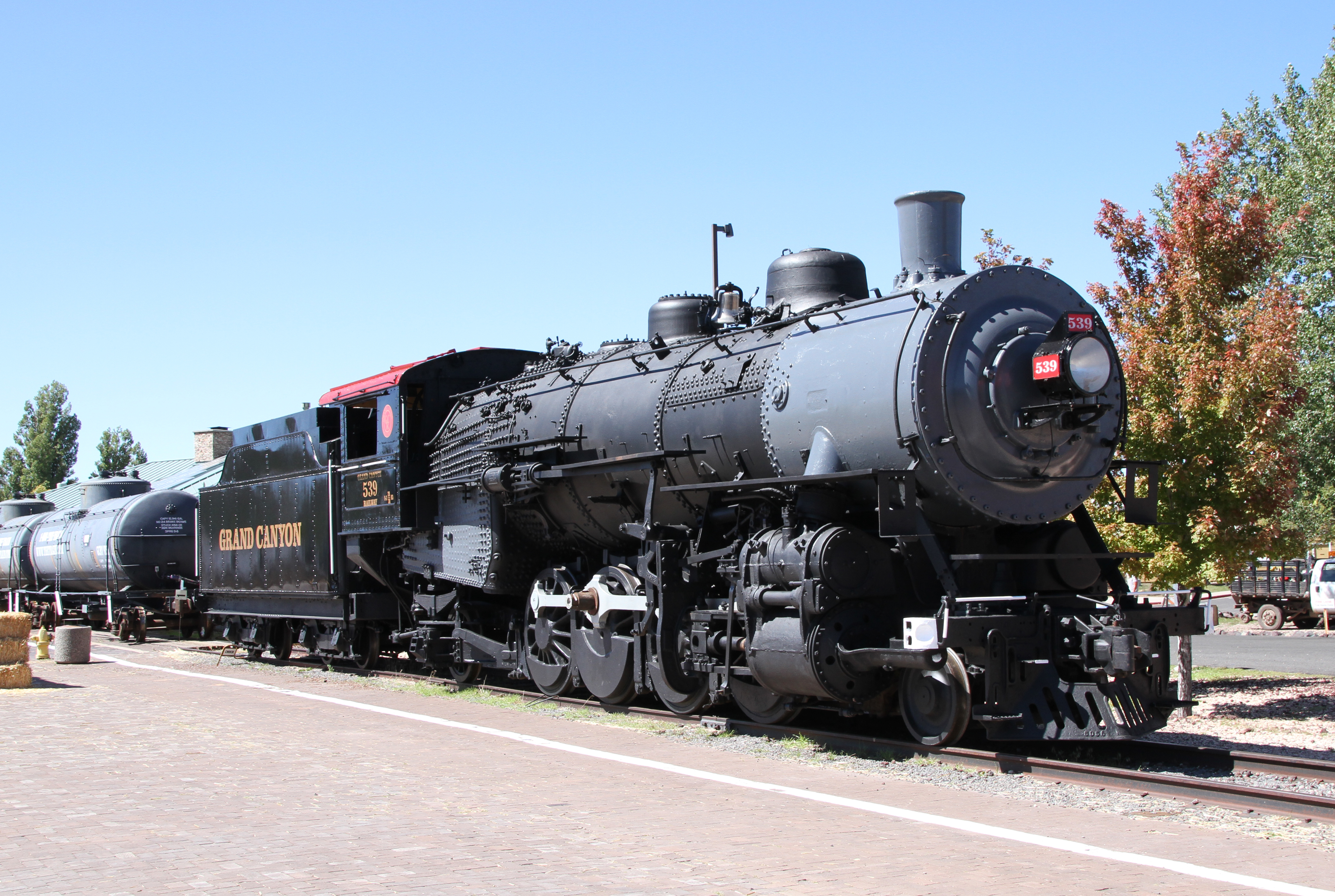
- No. 539 on static display at the Williams Depot shortly after its cosmetic repaint, 2014
Type and origin
- Power type: Steam
- Builder: American Locomotive Company (Brooks Works)
- Serial number: 57954
- Build date: September 1917
- Rebuild date: January 1946
Specifications
- Configuration
  - Whyte: 2-8-2
  - UIC: 1D'1 h2G
- Gauge: 4 ft 8 1/2 in (1,435 mm) standard gauge
- Driver dia.: 63 in (1,600 mm)
- Length: 77 ft (23 m)
- Axle load: 64,400 lb (29,200 kg)
- Adhesive weight: 247,000 lb (112,000 kg)
- Loco weight: 337,000 lb (153,000 kg)
- Total weight: 551,000 lb (250,000 kg)
- Fuel type: New: Coal; Now: Bunker oil
- Fuel capacity: Coal: 36,000 lb (16,329.3 kg; 16.3 t); Oil: 4,357 US gal (16,490 L; 3,628 imp gal)
- Water cap.: New: 10,000 US gal (38,000 L; 8,300 imp gal); Now: 9,300 US gal (35,000 L; 7,700 imp gal)
- Firebox
  - Grate area: 70.3 sq ft (6.53 m^{2})
- Boiler pressure: 200 lbf/in^{2} (1.38 MPa)
- Cylinders: Two, outside
- Cylinder size: 28 in × 30 in (711 mm × 762 mm)
- Valve gear: Walschaerts
- Valve type: Piston valves
- Loco brake: Air
- Train brakes: Air
- Couplers: Knuckle
Performance figures
- Maximum speed: 40 mph (64 km/h)
- Tractive effort: 57,120 lb (25,910 kg)
Career
- Operators: Northern Pacific Railway; Spokane, Portland and Seattle Railway
- Class: New: W-3 (NP); Now: O-3 (SP&S)
- Numbers: NP 1762; SP&S 539; GCRY 539
- Last run: 1956
- Retired: 1957
- Preserved: October 5, 1957
- Restored: 2014 (cosmetically)
- Current owner: Port of Kalama
- Disposition: On static display

Spokane, Portland and Seattle Railway 539 is the only preserved example of the class O-3 class 2-8-2 "Mikado" type steam locomotive. It was built by the American Locomotive Company's (ALCO) Brooks Works in 1917 for the Northern Pacific Railway (NP) as No. 1762. It was sold to the Spokane, Portland and Seattle Railway (SP&S) and renumbered to No. 539, in August 1944. It was reconfigured and converted to oil burning in January 1946. The locomotive was retired in 1957, and it was displayed in Esther Short Park, Washington, until 1997. That year, it was moved to Battle Ground for a potential restoration that never came to fruition. In 2007, it was acquired by the Grand Canyon Railway (GCR) and moved to Williams, Arizona for an operational restoration that also never came to fruition. In 2019, No. 539 was purchased again by the Port of Kalama, who moved it back to Washington and put it on static display inside the Port's Interpretive Center that was constructed in 2014.

== History ==
=== Revenue service ===
In the early 1910s, the Northern Pacific Railway (NP), a class I railroad that ran in the Northwestern United States between Washington (state) and Minnesota, had experienced an increase in freight traffic. They consequently decided to design a series of 2-8-2 "Mikado" type locomotives, and the locomotives were built by the American Locomotive Company (ALCO)’s various factories and the NP’s own shops in Brainerd, Minnesota. One of the classes was the W-3, with 135 such locomotives built by ALCO's former Brooks Locomotive Works in Dunkirk, New York, numbered 1700–1834. First, there were fifty-three built between March and May 1913, and then there were nineteen locomotives built in September 1917, and then thirty-nine locomotives in June 1918, and then twenty-four locomotives in November 1920.

No. 539 was numbered 1762 at the time, and was among the second batch of locomotives built in 1917. These enlarged versions of the basic W class 2-8-2s were assigned to pull dual service trains across the NP system, and they showed the effects of superheating on the layout of tubes and flues, and compared to the Q-5 4-6-2 "Pacifics" built by Brooks in 1920, the W-3s had slightly larger boilers, but with less firebox heating surfaces. The 1917 locomotives, as well as the later ones, had 216 tubes, which raised the evaporative heating surface area to 3,634 square feet.

The Spokane, Portland and Seattle Railway (SP&S) was jointly owned by the Northern Pacific and the Great Northern Railroads and was never permitted to design steam locomotives of its own. Rather, it received most of its motive power as hand-me-downs from its two parent companies, or as add-ons to one of its parents' orders of locomotives, such as the E-1 class 4-8-4 "Northerns". The SP&S operated twenty-six 2-8-2s, which were all obtained second-hand. Ten of such locomotives were NP W-3s that were acquired between 1926 and 1944; Numbers 1765, 1704, 1727, 1744, 1747, 1702, 1726, 1723, 1751, and 1762, and in that order, they were renumbered 530–539 by the SP&S.

No. 539 was acquired by the SP&S in August, 1944. While on the SP&S, they were reclassified as O-3s, and they were converted to burn oil, since the SP&S preferred that all the steamers on their roster burn oil, as opposed to coal, a common fuel source on the NP. Locomotive No. 539 was converted to oil burning in January 1946 (with the coal stoker returned to NP). No. 539, as well as No. 538, would have their water capacity decreased by 700 gallons in order to hold 4,357 gallons of oil. They also held four more boiler tubes than the other eight. The O-3s were assigned for dual service runs to Wishram and on the Oregon trunk to Bend, Oregon, and after 1954, when Diesel locomotives had completely replaced steam for passenger service, the O-3s were fully relegated to freight service. By 1957, the SP&S, the NP, and the Great Northern Railroads had all retired their steam locomotive fleets, and that same year, No. 539's fire was dropped for the last time, after logging approximately 174,378 miles without any major accidents or derailments.

=== Preservation ===
In 1957, the SP&S donated the No. 539 to the City of Vancouver. On September 30 of that year, a lift truck moved 33-foot sections of track in place in front of No. 539 as the locomotive made its 3 1/2-block run from Seventh and Harney Streets to its new display site at Esther Short Park. About 200 members of the railroad brotherhoods volunteered to move the locomotive, and it was accomplished in about five hours. Reuben E. Brown, a retired SP&S engineer, fireman, and Great Northern employee, was one of the engineers who drove No. 539 to its new home in the park, and he was one of several railroad veterans who showed up for that day's operation. The park with the locomotive was dedicated on October 5, 1957. Gleaming in a new paint job of black and silver, the locomotive would remain in the park as a lasting memorial to railroading's steam age for the next forty years. By 1960, No. 539 became one of only two SP&S steam locomotives that were left to survive, and the only other locomotive is 4-8-4 No. 700.

In the early 1990s, Brian Fleming, a former owner and operator of the Mount Hood Railroad, purchased No. 539 from the city, and he came up with plans to restore the locomotive to operating condition in Montana. Beginning on April 26, 1997, a salvation group removed some components to make moving No. 539 easier, including the connecting rods for smoother motion, and the cowcatcher for easier crane rigging access. Extended temporary rails were also installed behind the locomotive for additional space to position the cranes, since at the time, No. 539's display site was surrounded by trees. On June 21, workers with two trucks and a heavyweight crane arrived to move the locomotive down the street to the Burlington Northern (BN) mainline, and people gathered to watch the process. First, the tender was pulled out and lifted from the rails, and placed onto the flatbed of the first truck. Then, the locomotive itself was backed out of the park and then lifted up and placed onto the second truck. The locomotive and the tender were brought onto BN trackage and then towed to a nearby Power station under a rooftop.

On October 5, the locomotive arrived at a park in Battle Ground. In June 1999, a 120' x 90' steel building has been donated to the group. The building was dismantled and moved to Battle Ground awaiting reconstruction, since it was intended to be used to house the locomotive for restoration. Despite all these plans and donations, however, the potential restoration on No. 539 fell through. Instead, No. 539 sat on static display surrounded by portable metal fences. The locomotive was also missing most of its essential components, including all of its connecting rods, its boiler jacketing, its cylinder coverings, its headlight, and its builder's plates.

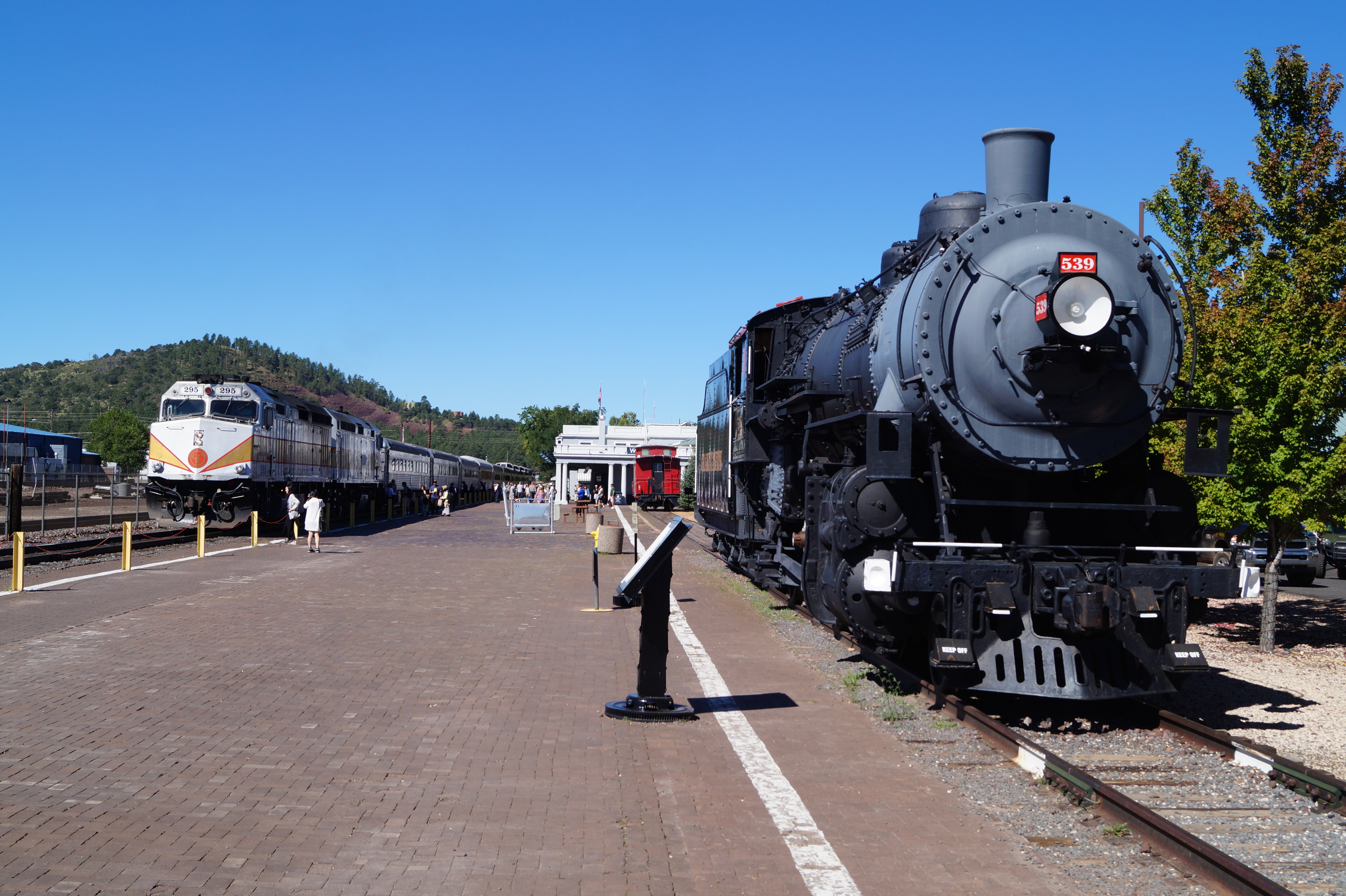
No. 539 at the Williams Depot near EMD F40PH No. 295, 2017

In 2007, the Grand Canyon Railway (GCRY), a former Atchison, Topeka and Santa Fe branch line that lied between Williams, Arizona and the south rim of the Grand Canyon National Park, was looking for a larger and more powerful locomotive to meet the demand for more tractive effort, since their loaded passenger trains were getting longer. Subsequently, Fleming approached an agreement with the GCRY to trade No. 539 in exchange for Ex-Lake Superior and Ishpeming (LS&I) 2-8-0 "Consolidation" locomotives Numbers 18 and 20. A train was made and tied on a skate of the main line at Battle Ground just before the Portland Vancouver Junction Railroad crew went off duty on April 5, and they expected to deliver No. 539 to the Burlington Northern and Santa Fe (BNSF) the following day. The boiler was separated from the frame and running gear, and they were placed on separate flatcars. The locomotive arrived at Williams in May of the same year. The initial plan was to give No. 539 a thorough rebuild to use it to pull their passenger trains alongside Ex-Chicago, Burlington and Quincy 2-8-2 No. 4960 and Ex-LS&I 2-8-0 No. 29. However, 2007 was also the year the GCRY first became a subsidiary of Xanterra Travel Collection, and they started growing concerns over steam locomotives in terms of fuel costs and environmental hazards. Thus, they ceased steam operations in late 2008. Beginning in 2009, however, they brought back steam operations with Numbers 29 and 4960 being converted to Vegetable oil fuel, and they are limited on when they could run. Despite steam operations still present on the GCRY, No. 539's rebuild there fell through, since the project on the locomotive was deemed to be too expensive, and two operational steam locomotives was considered to be enough. No. 539 sat idle by the GCRY's locomotive shops until early 2014, when the GCRY gave No. 539 a partial cosmetic restoration to improve its overall appearance as a static display, and then it was put on static display on the platform of the Williams Depot.

In 2014, the Port of Kalama opened an Interpretive Center, and they planned to place a NP steam locomotive inside as an icon that Kalama was created by the NP. However, there are only 20 locomotives from the NP left to survive, and none of them were available at that time. In late 2019, the Port of Kalama approached the GCRY, who agreed to sell No. 539 for shipment back to the Pacific Northwest. On January 23, 2020, No. 539 was separated into flatcars to leave Williams almost the same way it left Battle Ground in 2007. The following day, the 1,200 mile journey began, and on March 18, the locomotive arrived at Kalama. As it was unloaded, the boiler was re-attached to the frame and running gear once again. The locomotive was placed on extended rail and pushed inside the interpretive center without incident. As of 2022, No. 539 is still being given another cosmetic restoration inside the interpretive center. Although, the building is wide enough to fit the locomotive itself inside, it can't fit the locomotive and the tender together. Thus, the tender is being displayed just outside on the extended rail, with plans for a small rooftop to be built over it. As of 2025, No. 539 remains on static display inside the interpretive center at the Port of Kalama, where "Rail meets Sail".

== See also ==
- Spokane, Portland and Seattle 700
- Southern Pacific 745
- Southern Pacific 786
- Great Northern 2507
