= National Highway 3 (Djibouti) =

Road in Djibouti

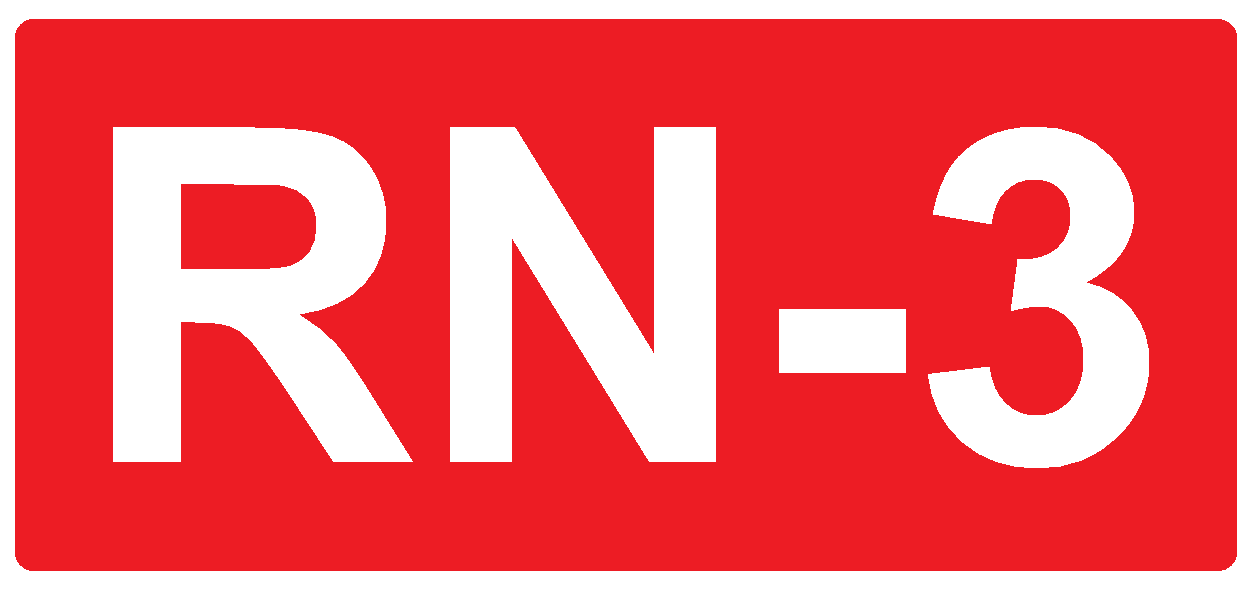
National Highway 3
- Arabic: الطريق السريع الوطنى 3 French: Route Nationale 3
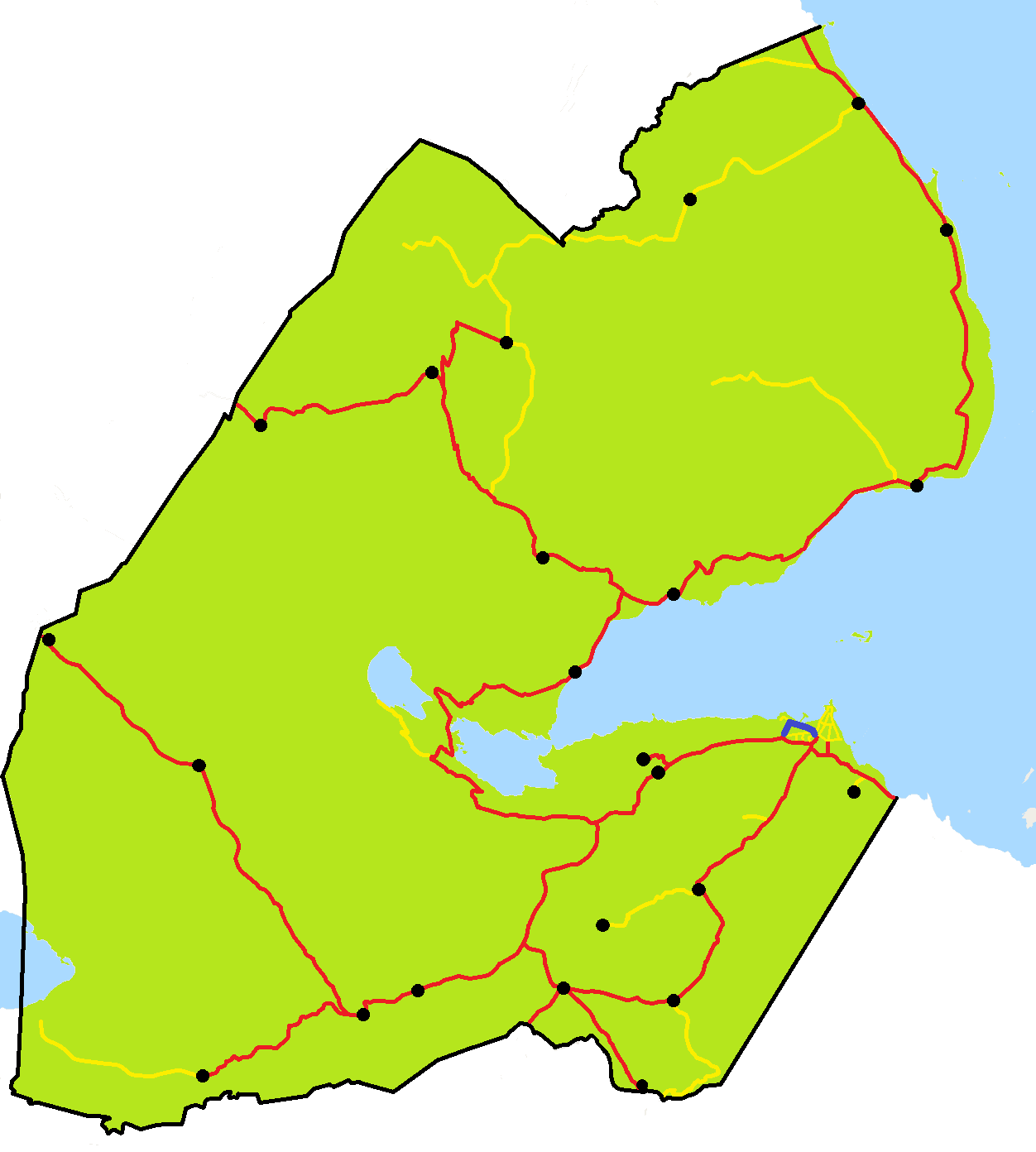

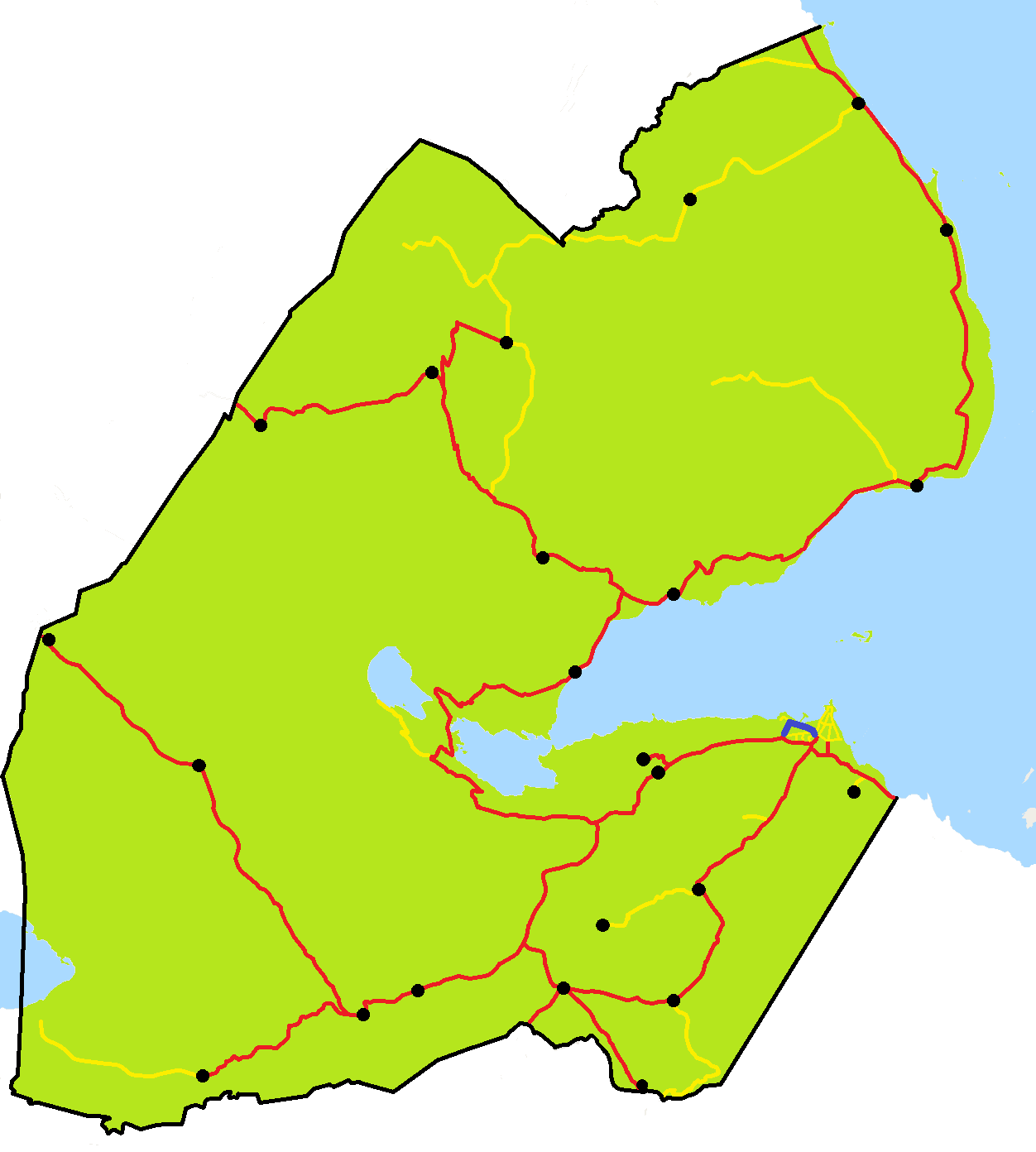

Route information
- Length: 10 km (6.2 mi)

Major junctions
- From: Djibouti City
- To: Balbala

Location
- Country: Djibouti

Highway system
- Transport in Djibouti

The RN-3 National Highway is a short national highway of Djibouti. The highway begins at 11°33′30″N 43°7′32″E, at a junction with National Highway 1 in Djibouti City, near College De Fukuzawa. It passes along the coast to the north of Djibouti City, past Port de Doraleh and terminates at a small beach resort at 11°35′30″N 43°1′18″E.
