= Samsung Galaxy A02 =

Budget Android smartphone from Samsung

Samsung Galaxy A02 Samsung Galaxy A02s Samsung Galaxy M02 Samsung Galaxy M02s Samsung Galaxy F02s
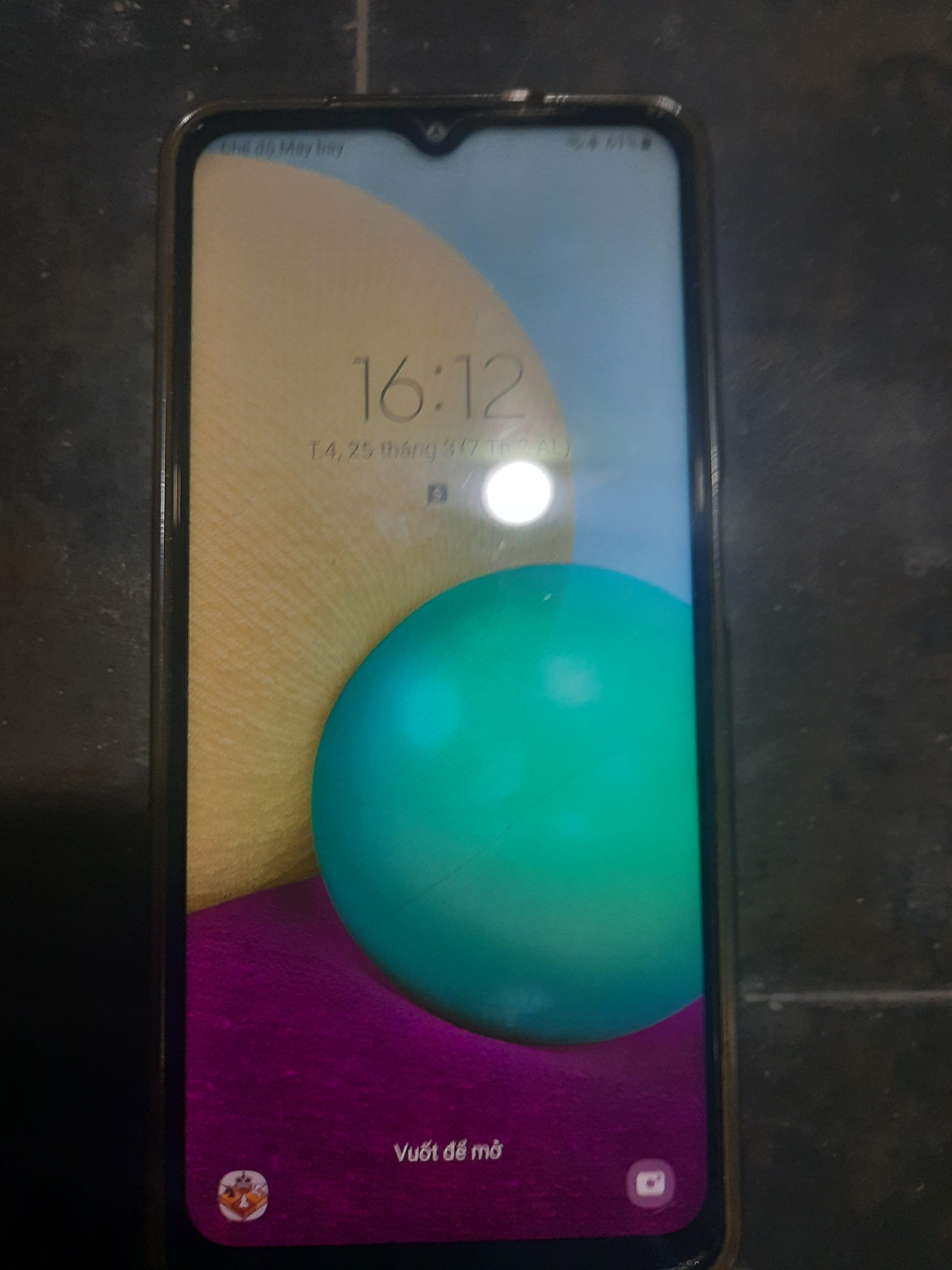
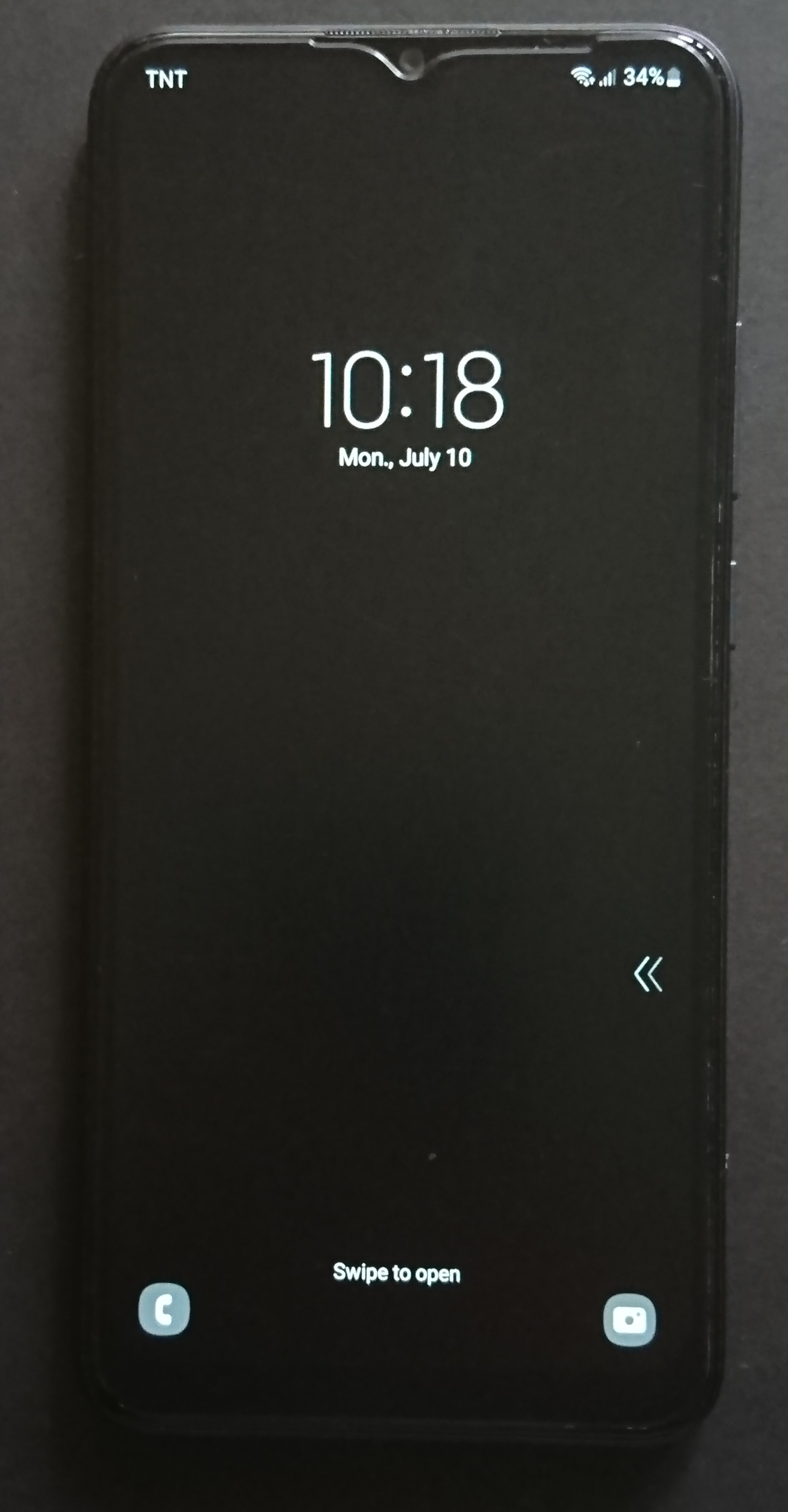
- Samsung Galaxy A02 in Lock screen The Galaxy A02s in its locked state
- Brand: Samsung
- Manufacturer: Samsung Electronics
- Series: A series
- First released: Galaxy A02s: November 24, 2020; 5 years ago Galaxy M02s: January 7, 2021; 5 years ago Galaxy A02: January 27, 2021; 5 years ago Galaxy M02: February 2, 2021; 5 years ago Galaxy F02s: April 5, 2021; 5 years ago
- Discontinued: August 18, 2021
- Predecessor: Samsung Galaxy A01; Samsung Galaxy A01 Core
- Successor: Samsung Galaxy A03
- Compatible networks: GSM / HSPA / 3G / LTE
- Dimensions: A02/M02: 164 mm (6.5 in) H; 75.9 mm (2.99 in) W; 9.1 mm (0.36 in) D; A02s/M02s/F02s: 164.2 mm (6.46 in) H; 75.9 mm (2.99 in) W; 9.1 mm (0.36 in) D
- Weight: A02/M02: 206 g (7.3 oz); A02s/M02s/F02s: 196 g (6.9 oz)
- Operating system: Original: One UI Core 2.5 over Android 10 (32-bit); Current: One UI Core 3.1 over Android 11 (32-bit)
- System-on-chip: MediaTek MT6739W (28 nm) (A02/M02); Qualcomm Snapdragon 450 (14 nm) (A02s/M02s/F02s)
- CPU: Quad-core 1.5 GHz Cortex-A53 (64-bit); Octa-core 1.8 GHz Cortex-A53 (64-bit)
- GPU: PowerVR GE8100; Adreno 506
- Modem: A02/M02: MT6177M; A02s/M02s/F02s: Snapdragon X9 LTE
- Memory: 2/3/4 GB RAM
- Storage: 32/64 GB internal storage
- Removable storage: Up to 512 GB; microSD
- Battery: 5000 mAh lithium polymer
- Charging: A02/M02: 7.75W Standard Charging; A02s/M02s/F02s: 15W Adaptive Fast Charging
- Rear camera: Dual-Camera Setup; A02/M02: Primary: Hynix Hi-1336; 13 MP, f/1.9, 28mm, 1/3.06", 1.12µm, AF; Macro: OmniVision OV02B1; 2 MP, f/2.4, 1/5.0", 1.75µm, FF; Triple-Camera Setup; A02s/M02s/F02s: Primary: Hynix Hi-1336; 13 MP, f/2.2, 26mm, 1/3.06", 1.12µm, AF; Macro: OmniVision OV02B1; 2 MP, f/2.4, 1/5.0", 1.75µm, FF; Depth: GalaxyCore GC02M1B; 2 MP, f/2.4, 1/5.0", 1.75µm, FF; Features: All: LED flash; Video: All: 1080p@30fps
- Front camera: A02/M02: Hynix Hi-556; 5 MP, f/2.0, 28mm (wide), 1/5.0", 1.12µm, FF; A02s/M02s/F02s: GalaxyCore GC5035; 5 MP, f/2.2, 28mm (wide), 1/5.0", 1.12µm, FF; Video: A02/M02: 720p@30fps; A02s/M02s/F02s: 1080p@30fps
- Display: 6.5 in HD+ PLS TFT LCD, (720x1600 resolution)
- Data inputs: Micro USB (A02/M02); USB-C (A02s/M02s/F02s)
- Model: SM-A022x (Galaxy A02); SM-A025x (Galaxy A02s); SM-M022x (Galaxy M02); SM-M025x (Galaxy M02s); SM-F025x (Galaxy F02s) (last letter varies by carrier and international models)
- SAR: 0.66 W/kg (head); 1.71 W/kg (body)
- Other: Accelerometer

The Samsung Galaxy A02 and the Galaxy A02s are budget Android-based smartphones manufactured by Samsung Electronics as a part of its A series. The former was announced on January 27, 2021, while the latter was first announced on November 24, 2020. The Galaxy A02 managed to sell over 18.3 million units after its launch.

There were several rebranded version of this device: the Galaxy M02 (which was announced on February 2, 2021), the Galaxy M02s (first announced on January 7, 2021), and the Galaxy F02s (first announced on April 5, 2021).

== Specifications ==
=== Design ===
All devices feature a plastic back and frame with a glass front. A distinctive pattern differentiates these models: the A02/M02 features a stripped back, while the A02s/M02s/F02s have a prism back pattern.

Galaxy A02 Galaxy M02	Galaxy A02s	Galaxy M02s Galaxy F02s
Red; Blue; Gray; Black	Red; Blue; White; Black	Red; Blue; Black

=== Hardware ===
==== Display ====
All devices feature the same 6.5 in PLS TFT capacitive touchscreen with a resolution of 720 x 1600 (~270 ppi).

==== Cameras ====
The Galaxy A02/M02 feature a dual-camera setup arranged vertically on the left side of the rear of the phone along with the flash. The main camera is a 13 MP wide lens and the second is a 2 MP depth sensor. The main camera can record video up at 1080p @ 30 fps. A single 5 MP front-facing camera is present in a notch.

The Galaxy A02s/M02s/F02s feature a triple-camera setup arranged vertically on the left side of the rear of the phone along with the flash. The main camera is a 13 MP wide lens, a 2 MP depth sensor, and a 2 MP macro sensor. The main camera can record video up at 1080p @ 30 fps. A single 5 MP front-facing camera is present in a notch.

==== Processor and memory ====
The A02/M02 is powered by the MediaTek MT6739W quad-core SoC, while the A02s/M02s/F02s is powered by the Qualcomm Snapdragon 450 octa-core SoC.

All variants can have either 32 GB or 64 GB of internal storage as well as either 2 GB, 3 GB, or 4 GB (for the "s" variants) of RAM. Internal storage can be expanded via a microSD card up to 512 GB. All variants use eMMC for its internal storage.

==== Battery ====
The A02/M02 have a non-removable 5000 mAh lithium-ion battery with 7.75W charging. The A02s/M02s/F02s have the same battery capacity as the A02/M02 but features a faster 15W charging.

=== Software ===
Both phones come with One UI Core 2.5 based on Android 10, and are upgradable to One UI Core 3.1 based on Android 11. Only the Galaxy A02s got Android 12 with One UI Core 4.1, possibly due to hardware limitations on the Galaxy A02.
