= Spokane, Portland and Seattle 700 =

Preserved American 4-8-4 steam locomotive

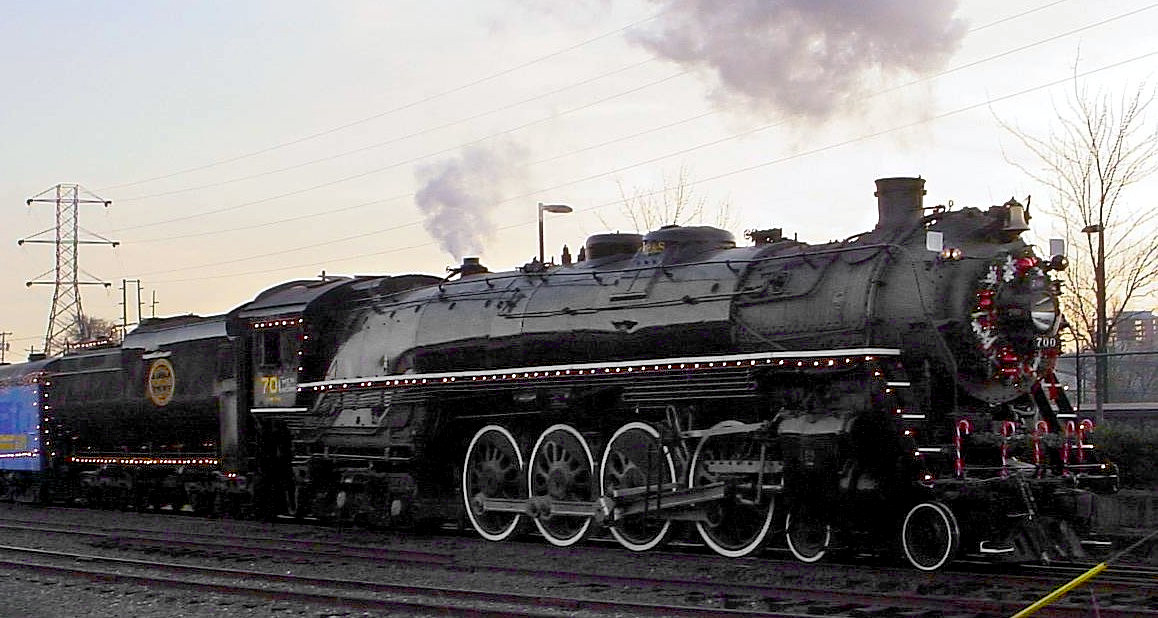
- SP&S No. 700 awaiting to start a Christmas excursion in December 2005
Type and origin
- Power type: Steam
- Builder: Baldwin Locomotive Works
- Serial number: 62171
- Build date: May 1938
Specifications
- Configuration
  - Whyte: 4-8-4
  - UIC: 2′D2′ h2
- Gauge: 4 ft 8 1/2 in (1,435 mm) standard gauge
- Driver dia.: 77 in (1,956 mm)
- Length: 110 ft 6 3/4 in (33.70 m)
- Height: 16 ft (4.88 m)
- Axle load: 77,200 lb (35,000 kg; 35.0 t)
- Adhesive weight: 294,500 lb (133,600 kg; 133.6 t)
- Loco weight: 485,820 lb (220,360 kg; 220.36 t)
- Total weight: 879,600 lb (399,000 kg; 399.0 t)
- Fuel type: Bunker oil
- Fuel capacity: 6,040 US gal (22,900 L; 5,030 imp gal)
- Water cap.: 20,000 US gal (76,000 L; 17,000 imp gal)
- Firebox
  - Grate area: 115 sq ft (10.7 m^{2})
- Boiler pressure: 260 lbf/in^{2} (1.79 MPa)
- Superheater
  - Heating area: 2,095 sq ft (194.6 m^{2})
- Cylinders: Two, outside
- Cylinder size: 28 in × 31 in (711 mm × 787 mm)
- Valve gear: Walschaerts
- Valve type: Piston valves
- Loco brake: Air
- Train brakes: Air
- Couplers: Knuckle
Performance figures
- Power output: 4,500 hp (3,400 kW) at 50 mph
- Tractive effort: 69,800 lbf (310.49 kN)
- Factor of adh.: 4.16
Career
- Operators: Spokane, Portland and Seattle Railway; Oregon Rail Heritage Center
- Class: E-1
- Numbers: SP&S 700; NP 2668
- Nicknames: The Lady; The First Lady of the Northwest; The Night Princess
- Delivered: June 21, 1938
- Retired: May 20, 1956
- Preserved: January 14, 1958
- Restored: May 15, 1990
- Current owner: The City of Portland, Oregon
- Disposition: Operational
- Spokane, Portland and Seattle Railway Steam Locomotive
- U.S. National Register of Historic Places
- Coordinates: 45°30′26″N 122°39′43″W
- NRHP reference No.: 05001557
- Added to NRHP: January 25, 2006

Spokane, Portland & Seattle 700 is the oldest and only surviving example of the class E-1 4-8-4 "Northern" type steam locomotive and the only surviving "original" (not purchased used from another railroad) Spokane, Portland and Seattle Railway steam locomotive. It was built by the Baldwin Locomotive Works in May 1938. Nearly identical to the class "A-3" Northerns built for Northern Pacific Railway, it burns oil instead of coal.

After years of running second-hand equipment, the Spokane, Portland and Seattle Railway (SP&S) was allowed by its parent companies, Great Northern Railway and Northern Pacific Railway, to purchase its first new locomotives. These included three Northern E-1 class locomotives (700, 701 and 702) for passenger service and six Z-6 class Challengers (4-6-6-4s) for freight service.

After retirement from service in 1956, the SP&S 700 was donated to the City of Portland, Oregon in 1958. It was on static public display near Oaks Amusement Park at Oaks Pioneer Park until 1987, then moved to private quarters (the Southern Pacific Roundhouse at Brooklyn Yard) for the continuation of work to restore it to operating condition. It began making occasional excursion runs in 1990. In 2012, the 700 was moved to a new facility where it can again be viewed by the public, the Oregon Rail Heritage Center.

== History ==
=== Revenue service years ===
No. 700 was built in May 1938 by the Baldwin Locomotive Works (BLW) and was delivered on June 21, 1938, joining the 702 pulling overnight passenger trains between Spokane and Vancouver, Washington, along the north shore of the Columbia River, with the No. 701 providing backup and pulling freight. Owing to an undersized turntable, the Northerns didn't reach Portland, Oregon until 1944.

By 1947, the Great Northern Railway had begun to streamline its premier passenger train, The Empire Builder, and had started adding diesels to the locomotive mix. SP&S also started purchasing diesels at this time, but they arrived after the streamlined cars were brought into service and for a few months, the 700s pulled the Portland section of Great Northern's Empire Builder and Northern Pacific's North Coast Limited.

Through the late 1940s and early 1950s, the E-1s continued to pull secondary passenger trains, but by 1954, the diesels had completely replaced steam for passenger service and the E-1s were relegated to pulling freight trains until 1955. On May 20, 1956, a spruced-up No. 700, with its normally grey smokebox painted silver, pulled its last passenger train. The Farewell To Steam run had a total of 21 cars carrying 1,400 passengers from Portland, Oregon to Wishram, Washington, in the heart of the Columbia Gorge, and back again.

=== Preservation ===
After the trip, the 700, 701, 702, Challengers and other SP&S locomotives were sent to the scrap line. At the same time, however, Union Pacific Railroad was offering to donate a steam locomotive to the city of Portland, Oregon, and not to be outdone, the SP&S offered the 700. It was donated on January 14, 1958. The two locomotives (SP&S 700 and OR&N 197) were moved onto recently purchased city land renamed Oaks Pioneer Park near Oaks Park along the Willamette River in 1958 and were soon joined by SP 4449 where they sat for nearly 20 years. By 1960, No. 700 became one of only two SP&S steam locomotives left to survive, and the other locomotive is 2-8-2 No. 539, although 539 was originally built for the Northern Pacific Railway as their 1762. Locomotive 1762/539 is on display at the Port of Kalama Interpretive Center.

=== Display at Oaks Pioneer Park ===
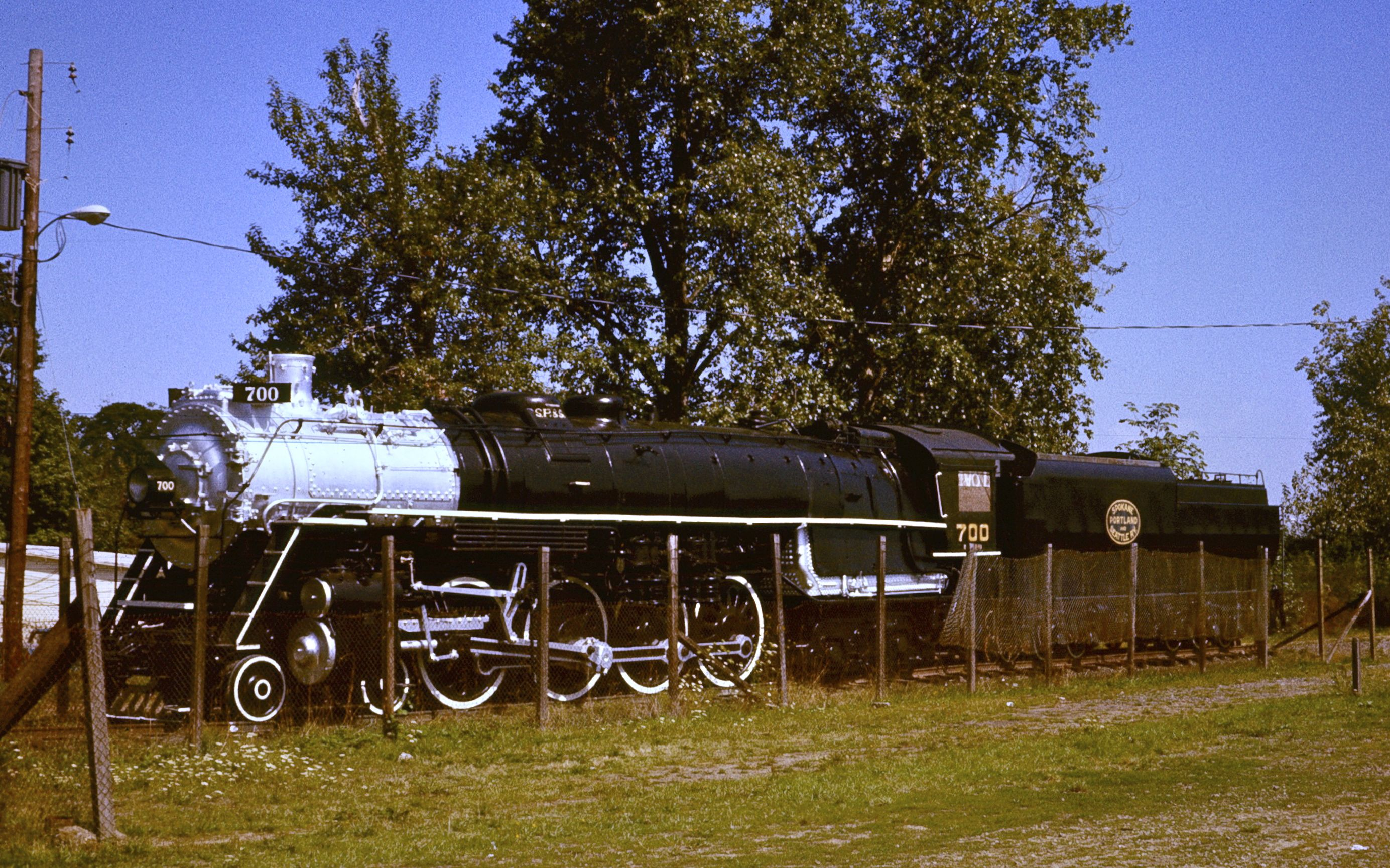
In 1978, No. 700 was still on long-term static display near Oaks Park

For nearly 20 years the 700, along with other locomotives and other historic rail equipment, sat behind chain link fences, slowly fading and rusting away. Only the attention of an interested Southern Pacific Railroad employee and member of the Pacific Northwest Chapter of the National Railway Historical Society, Jack Holst, saved the locomotives from complete uselessness. Mr. Holst regularly visited the locomotives and kept the bearings and rods well greased and oiled. Unfortunately, Mr. Holst died in 1972, before the first locomotive, SP 4449, was removed from Oaks Pioneer Park and restored. In 1975, 15-year-old Chris McLarney started working on the 700, cleaning and oiling various parts. He founded the PRPA (Pacific Railroad Preservation Association) in 1977 to provide support for the preservation work.

On November 9, 1987, the SP&S 700 was moved from Oaks Pioneer Park to the Southern Pacific's Brooklyn Roundhouse, in southeast Portland, for the continuation of restoration work. With the support of many individuals and the Burlington Northern Railroad, No. 700 returned to operation on May 15, 1990.

=== Excursion service ===
Although it's one of the largest steam locomotive still in operation and expensive to run and insure, the 700 has managed a number of excursions since its restoration on May 15, 1990, including an historic doubleheader with SP 4449 from Portland, Oregon to Wishram, Washington and back during the 2005 National Railway Historical Society national convention and a 2002 "Steam across Montana" from Sandpoint, Idaho to Billings, Montana and back. In the Spring of 2001, the 700 ran a special excursion called the "Homecoming" excursion that ran over the original SP&S mainline through the Columbia River Gorge and lasted 4-days from Portland, all the way to Spokane, WA and return. The 700 led the train solo almost the entire trip. At one point during the excursion, it started having mechanical issues and BNSF #6308, an EMD SD40-2 locomotive which would also end up being preserved, was taken off of the train it was on and helped the 700 the rest of the way. The excursion ended, as a result of a derailment between the tool car and the power car. The lead trucks on the power car caused the derailment to occur ending the excursion abruptly. It also was disguised as Northern Pacific #2668 (the next number available after the A-3's numbering class ended, which was 2660–2667) in 1992 for the Northern Pacific Rail Historical Society's convention, as the SP&S E-1 design is identical to the NP A-3 class, other than that the SP&S' Northerns burned oil, while the NP's burned coal.

The No. 700 was added to the National Register of Historic Places on January 25, 2006, as the Spokane, Portland and Seattle Railway Steam Locomotive.

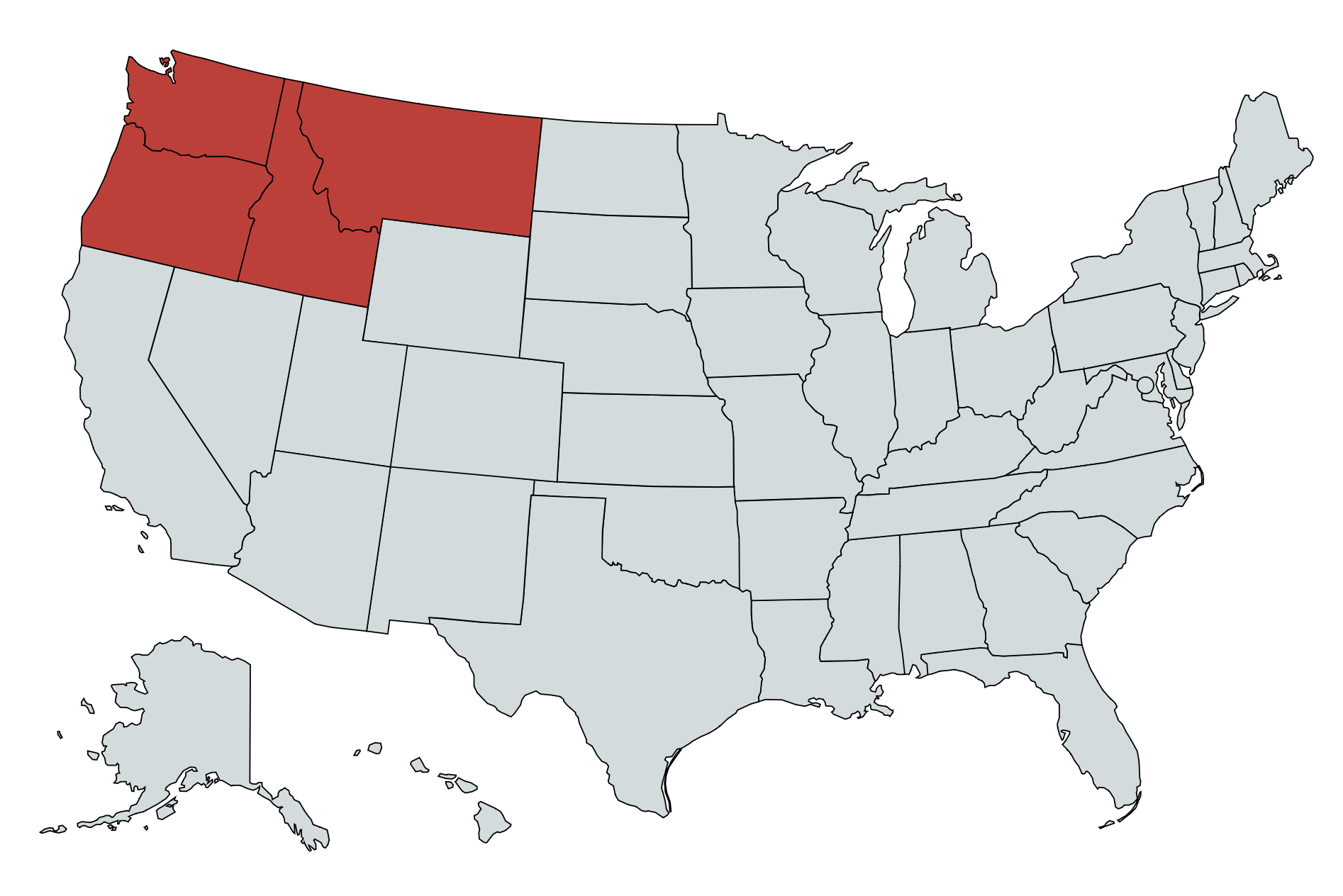
US states visited by No. 700 in excursion service

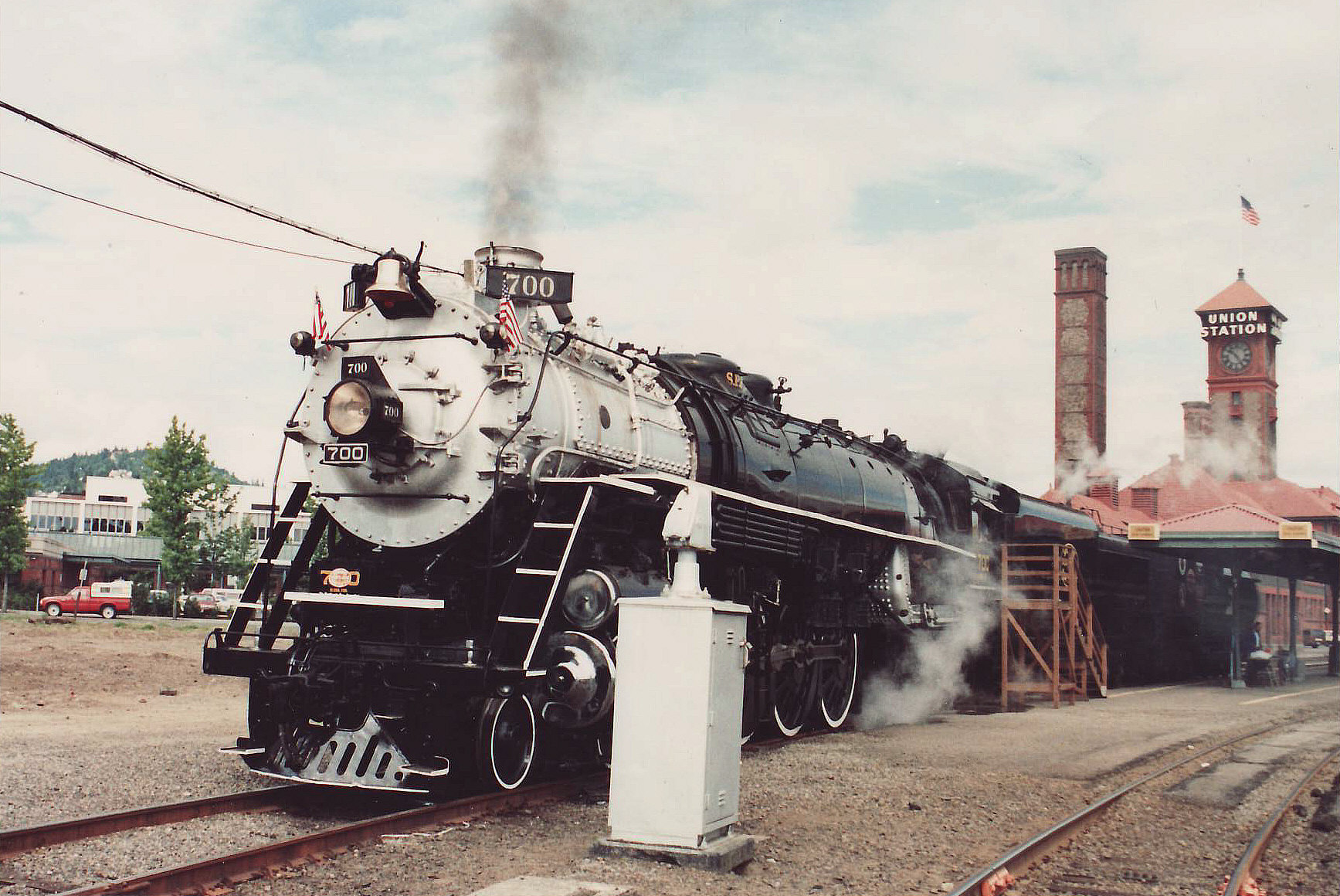
No. 700 at Portland Union Station in June 1991

=== Disposition and maintenance ===
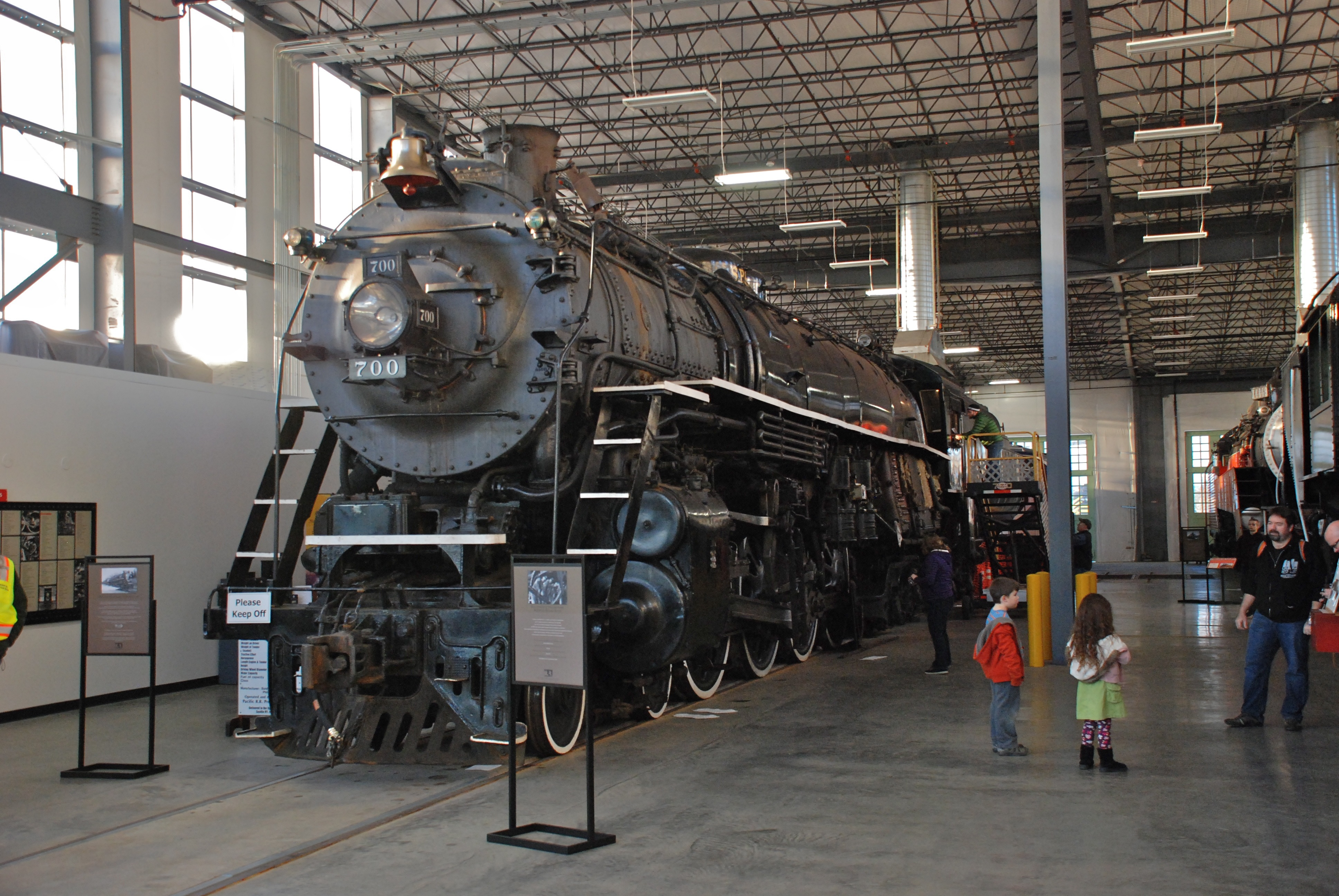
SP&S No. 700 on public view at its new home, the Oregon Rail Heritage Center in 2013

Until June 2012, the No. 700 and its two companions resided at the Union Pacific Brooklyn Roundhouse. The City of Portland was leasing the roundhouse from its owner, Union Pacific Railroad (UP), but after the railroad announced plans to demolish the roundhouse to allow expansion of the yard, the engines needed to find a new home. The Oregon Rail Heritage Foundation, with significant support from the City of Portland, raised funds for a new restoration and visitor center down the street from the Oregon Museum of Science and Industry to provide the city's steam locomotives with a permanent and publicly accessible home before the closure of the roundhouse.

Construction of the new Oregon Rail Heritage Center began in October 2011 and the 700 and the other two Portland-owned steam locomotives and other rail equipment was moved to the site of the new enginehouse and heritage center on June 26, 2012. They were moved indoors on July 28, once the enginehouse was enclosed. The ORHC opened to the public on September 22, 2012.

Maintenance of the 700 continues to be carried out by the Pacific Railroad Preservation Association and a team of volunteers. The locomotive was taken out of service in 2015 for its 1,472-day inspection as mandated by the Federal Railroad Administration (FRA). In August 2020, Emery Trust awarded a grant of $35,000 to help complete No. 700's rebuild, and in March 2023, Emery trust awarded an additional grant of $10,500. In May 2025, the overhaul job of No. 700 was completed, and the locomotive was fired up for display on National Train Day, although recent restrictions made by the Oregon Pacific Railroad in 2022 may prevent the 700 from running on the railroad through to Oaks Park for the foreseeable future.

== Accidents ==
- In 1938, during its trial run in Spokane, the engine stopped in front of a rockslide that was blocking the tracks. The tracks were later cleared, but a second rockslide occurred and debris struck the engine as it began pulling ahead, damaging its trailing truck.
- On March 25, 1947, while pulling a passenger train in Washington, the 700 suffered a catastrophic derailment near Snake River after hitting a rockslide at 45 mph (72 km/h), it slid down the bank and toppled onto its left side. The engineer, fireman, and leading brakeman escaped with only minor injuries. After being pull up from the bank, the engine was sent to the shops for repairs and continued service.

== See also ==
- Southern Pacific 4449
- Oregon Railroad & Navigation 197
- Oregon Rail Heritage Foundation
