= 3A (band) =

German pop band

Background information
- Origin: Nieukerk, Germany
- Genres: Pop, Rock
- Years active: 2010–present
- Labels: Sony Music Entertainment
- Members: Aaron Lovac; Abel Lovac; Adam Lovac
- Website: 3a-musik.de

3A is a German pop band consisting of brothers Aaron, Abel, and Adam Lovac.

== Band history ==
The Lovac brothers were discovered in Nieukerk, Germany, when they were between the ages of only 11 to 13 years old. In 2010, they published their first album titled Teenage Queen. This led to their discovery by German producer Peter Hoffmann and a record deal with the major label Sony Music. At first, the band was known as LaLaLa, however they changed their name to 3A before the publication of their next album, #wirsindhier. In 2013 they were included in the opening act for Tyler Ward's 11 concerts in Germany. In February 2014, the band released their first single, Sind Wir Freunde?, which reached 81 on the German singles chart. Their album #wirsindhier appeared with some delay in April of that year and also reached the 85th spot on the chart.

In May 2016 Lina Larissa Strahl published her album Official, as a part of which band member Aaron Lovac accompanies Strahl for the song Mädchen liebt das Feuer.

== Band members ==
- Aaron Lovac, September 20, 1996 (age 28), Singer and Drummer
- Abel Lovac, February 23, 1998 (age 27), Singer and Guitarist
- Adam Lovac, February 4, 1999 (age 26), Singer and Bassist

== Discography ==
Albums

- Teenage Queen (2010)
- #wirsindhier (2014)

Songs

- Sind wir Freunde? (2014)
- Parallel (2014)
