= List of A3 roads =

This is a list of roads designated A3. Roads entries are sorted in the countries alphabetical order.

- A3 motorway (Algeria), a road connecting Blida with the Algeria-Morocco border
- A003 road (Argentina), a road connecting the junction with National Route 9 and Camino de Cintura to Tigre
- A3 road (Australia) may refer to:
  - A3 (Sydney), a road in Sydney connecting the Northern Beaches and Southern suburbs
  - Tasman Highway, a road connecting Hobart and Launceston
  - Burnett Highway, Queensland
  - D'Aguilar Highway, Queensland
  - Gympie Road, Brisbane, Queensland
  - New England Highway, Queensland
- A3 motorway (Austria), a road connecting Knoten Guntramsdorf and Ebreichsdorf
- A3 motorway (Belgium), a road connecting Brussel and Liège
- A3 motorway (Bulgaria), a road connecting Sofia (via A6) and the border crossing to Greece, at the village of Kulata
- A3 highway (Botswana), connecting Francistown and Maun
- A3 motorway (Croatia), a road connecting the border crossings with Slovenia and Serbia and passing through Zagreb
- A3 motorway (Cuba), a road connecting Havana and Melena del Sur
- A3 motorway (Cyprus), a road connecting Larnaca and Ayia Napa
- A3 motorway (France), a road connecting Montreuil-sous-Bois, Rosny-sous-Bois and Bondy
- A3 motorway (Germany), a road connecting Wesel and Passau
- A3 motorway (Greece), a road connecting Lamia and Grevena
- A3 motorway (Italy), a road connecting Naples and the Reggio Calabria
- A3 road (Jamaica), a road connecting Kingston and Saint Ann's Bay
- A3 highway (Kazakhstan), a road connecting Almaty to Oskemen
- A3 road (Kenya), a road connecting to Liboi at the Somali border
- A3 road (Latvia), a road connecting Inčukalns and the Estonian border in Valka
- A3 highway (Lesotho), a road connecting Mantsonyane and Thaba-Tseka
- A3 highway (Lithuania), a road connecting Vilnius and Minskas
- A3 motorway (Luxembourg), a road connecting Luxembourg City to Dudelange
- A3 motorway (Morocco), a road connecting Casablanca and Rabat
- A3 highway (Nigeria), a road connecting Port Harcourt to the Republic of Cameroon at north-east Nigeria
- A3 road (People's Republic of China) may refer to:
  - A3 expressway (Shanghai), the former name of the S3 expressway, a planned expressway in Shanghai
- A3 autostrada (Poland), a formerly planned motorway in western Poland
- A3 motorway (Portugal), a road connecting Porto and Braga
- A3 motorway (Romania), a road planned to connect when fully constructed Bucharest to the western border near Oradea
- A3 motorway (Serbia), a road connecting Belgrade and Croatian border
- A3 motorway (Slovenia), a road connecting Gabrk and Fernetiči at the Italian border
- A3 road (Spain) may refer to:
  - A-3 motorway (Spain), a road connecting Madrid and Valencia
  - A3 motorway (Extremadura), a road connecting Zafra and Jerez de los Caballeros
- A3 motorway (Switzerland), a road connecting Basel and Sargans
- A 3 road (Sri Lanka), a road connecting Peliyagoda and Puttalam
- A3 motorway (Tunisia), a road connecting Tunis and Oued Zarga
- A3 road (United Kingdom) may refer to:
  - A3 road (Great Britain), a road connecting London and Portsmouth
  - A3 road (Isle of Man), a road connecting Castletown and Ramsey
  - A3 road (Northern Ireland), a road connecting Lisburn and Middletown
- A3 road (United States of America) may refer to:
  - Interstate A-3, a road connecting Anchorage and Soldotna
  - County Route A3, a road connecting Standish and Buntingville
- A3 road (Zimbabwe), a road connecting Manicatown and Harare via Chitungwiza

== See also ==
- List of highways numbered 3
