= List of highways numbered 3B =

The following highways are numbered 3B:

== United States ==
- Massachusetts Route 3B (former)
- New Hampshire Route 3B (former)
- New York State Route 3B (former)
- Nevada State Route 3B (former)
