= Annexin A3 =

Protein-coding gene in the species Homo sapiens

ANXA3
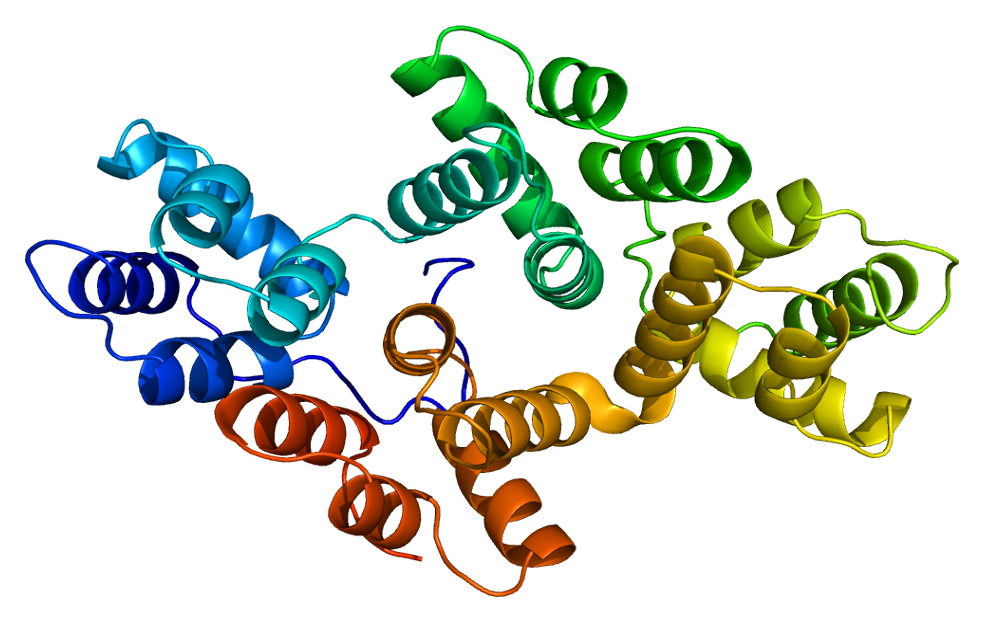

Identifiers
- Aliases: ANXA3, ANX3, annexin A3
- External IDs: OMIM: 106490; MGI: 1201378; GeneCards: ANXA3
Available structures
PDB	Ortholog search: PDBe RCSB
PDB	List of PDB id codes 1AII, 1AXN

Gene location (Human)
Chr.	Chromosome 4 (human)
Band	4q21.21	Start	78,551,747 bp
Band	4q21.21	End	78,610,451 bp

Gene location (Mouse)
Chr.	Chromosome 5 (mouse)
Band	5 E3|5 47.29 cM	Start	96,941,198 bp
Band	5 E3|5 47.29 cM	End	96,993,825 bp
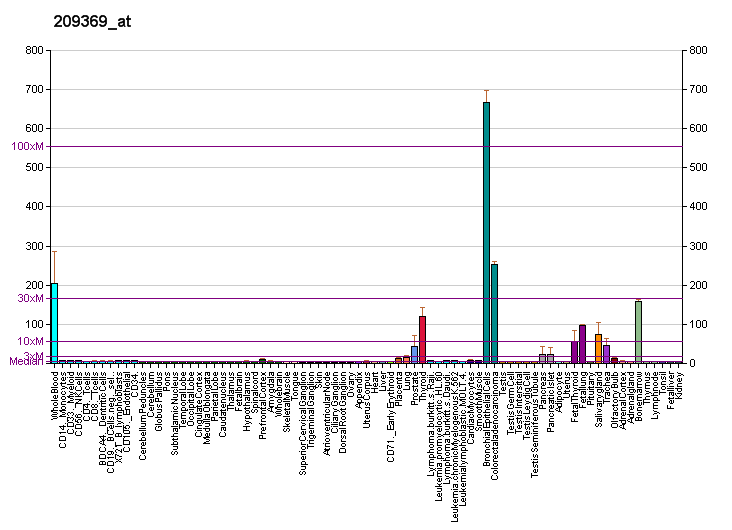
RNA expression pattern
Bgee	Human / Mouse (ortholog); Top expressed in: right lung; germinal epithelium; bone marrow; upper lobe of left lung; bone marrow cell; minor salivary glands; left lobe of thyroid gland; trabecular bone; right lobe of thyroid gland; body of stomach / Top expressed in: right lung lobe; mucous cell of stomach; pyloric antrum; endothelial cell of lymphatic vessel; left lung; granulocyte; left lung lobe; decidua; epithelium of stomach; gastrula; More reference expression data
BioGPS	More reference expression data
Gene ontology
Molecular function	phospholipase inhibitor activity; calcium ion binding; phospholipase A2 inhibitor activity; calcium-dependent protein binding; calcium-dependent phospholipid binding
Cellular component	cytoplasm; phagocytic vesicle membrane; membrane; plasma membrane; axon; soma; dendrite; specific granule; extracellular exosome; cytosol
Biological process	negative regulation of catalytic activity; positive regulation of DNA metabolic process; neutrophil degranulation; positive regulation of DNA-binding transcription factor activity; response to glucocorticoid; positive regulation of angiogenesis; positive regulation of endothelial cell migration; defense response to bacterium; animal organ regeneration; phagocytosis; response to growth factor; hippocampus development; homophilic cell adhesion via plasma membrane adhesion molecules; regulation of NMDA receptor activity
Sources:Amigo / QuickGO
Orthologs
Databases	NCBI: entry; OMA: entry
Species	Human	Mouse
Entrez	306	11745
Ensembl	ENSG00000138772	ENSMUSG00000029484
UniProt	P12429	O35639
RefSeq (mRNA)	NM_005139	NM_013470
RefSeq (protein)	NP_005130	NP_038498
Location (UCSC)	Chr 4: 78.55 – 78.61 Mb	Chr 5: 96.94 – 96.99 Mb
PubMed search
- Wikidata
View/Edit Human	View/Edit Mouse

Annexin A3 is a protein that in humans is encoded by the ANXA3 gene.

It is abnormally expressed in fetuses of both IVF and ICSI, which may contribute to the increase risk of birth defects in these ART.

This gene encodes a member of the annexin family. Members of this calcium-dependent phospholipid-binding protein family play a role in the regulation of cellular growth and in signal transduction pathways. This protein functions in the inhibition of phospholipase A2 and cleavage of inositol 1,2-cyclic phosphate to form inositol 1-phosphate. This protein may also play a role in anti-coagulation.
