= A-Train III =

1990 video game

- North American PC box art
- Developer: Artdink
- Publishers: JP: Artdink; NA: Maxis; EU: Ocean Software
- Series: A-Train
- Platforms: PC-98, FM Towns, X68000, Amiga, MS-DOS, Mac, PlayStation, Super Famicom, Windows 95
- Release: JP: December 1990 (PC-98, FM Towns, X68000); JP: April 1991 (PC-98, FM-Towns editor); NA/EU: October 1992 (Amiga, MS-DOS, Mac); JP: March 2000 (Windows 95); JP: March 2001 (Windows 95, within Memorial Pack)
- Genre: Business simulation
- Mode: Single-player

A-Train III, known internationally as A-Train, is a 1990 business simulation video game and the third game in the A-Train series. It was originally developed and published by Japanese game developer Artdink for Japan, and was later published by Maxis for the United States.

== Gameplay ==
The game places players in command of a railway company. There are no rival companies; the player controls the only one in the city and the game is resultingly fairly open-ended. A-Train III is the first game in the series to use a near-isometric dimetric projection to present the city, similar to the later SimCity 2000 by Maxis.

There are two types of transport that the player's company can take: passengers or building materials. The former is more likely to be profitable, but building materials allow the city to grow.

Wherever the building materials are delivered, they can be taken and used to construct buildings for the city. These start with houses, but eventually, as an area grows, roads, and shops and other buildings are built. These can provide extra revenue for a passenger service, but also allowing the city to develop and grow can be seen as a goal in itself.

As well as the buildings built by the computer, in response to the materials being present, the player can construct their own buildings, such as ski resorts and hotels, and make profits from them if the conditions are right.

=== Economic model ===
A-Train contains a very challenging economic system that includes a 5% land tax on all property owned, and a 50% income tax. The economic model however fails to capture realistic land prices, which adds a major flaw to the game's design. Certain buildings the AI is not allowed to build, such as the Amusement Park, Golf Course, and stadium. These buildings cost a relatively similar price no matter where they are placed, however, if placed in a thriving city, they can be sold for up to $6mil. This bug completely circumvents the difficulty inherent in the highly restrictive economic model.

== Editor ==
A.III. MAP CONSTRUCTION, known internationally as A-Train Construction Set, is an editor that can change existing saved games, or to build landscapes from scratch. It comes with 6 sample maps.

Maxis also published A-Train Construction Set with A-Train as a single package in Europe, without the Ocean Software label.

== Ports ==
Artdink ported A-Train III along with the editor to Windows 95, and published both titles as a package as the 3rd ARTDINK BEST CHOICE title in Japan.

The game was tremendously popular in Japan, motivating Maxis to license it for US distribution as A-Train, available for MS-DOS, Mac, and Amiga. It was released in October, 1992, and sold poorly.

Even the release of an add-on pack for the game failed to stir up any real support amongst the gaming community. The game was the first major failure from Maxis.

In spite of the PC version's commercial failure in the US, Maxis later released a PlayStation version in 1996, based on Artdink's AIV: Evolution Global. The PlayStation was a relatively new platform at that point and the game suffered many limitations, such as requiring an entire memory card (expensive at the time) to store a single map. Like the PC version, it proved unsuccessful.

== Reception ==
Reception (A-Train III / A-Train)

Review scores
Publication	Score
Dragon	DOS: 4/5
Famitsu	PC Engine: 29 / 40
GamesMaster	Amiga: 82%
Datormagazin	Amiga: 92%
Svenska Hemdatornytt	DOS: 94%
The One	Amiga: 90%

Award
Publication	Award
Codie award	Best Strategy Program

Computer Gaming World's reviewer Stanley Trevena stated in 1992 that while he enjoyed the financial and management aspects of A-Train, "many people will miss out on a fine program because of a steeply graded learning curve".

The game was reviewed in 1992 in Dragon #187 by Hartley, Patricia, and Kirk Lesser in "The Role of Computers" column. The reviewers gave the game 4 out of 5 stars. In 1993 the game received a Codie award from the Software Publishers Association for Best Strategy Program. A-Train's isometric, tile-based graphics and animated elements inspired the visual style Maxis went on to adopt for Simcity 2000 in 1993.

In 1994, PC Gamer UK named A-Train III the 46th best computer game of all time. The editors wrote, "Fascinating, absorbing and now quite cheap, A-Train is worth a place in any games collection — and don't be put off by the subject matter. It's brilliant fun."

== Legacy ==
In later years, development of the series continued on both console and PC platforms. A5, released for PlayStation and PC in 1997, introduced a totally 3D environment. A6, the first game in the series for PlayStation 2, was released in Japan in 2000 and later translated to English and released in Europe as A6: A-Train 6 by Midas Interactive Entertainment in 2004. A Ressha de Ikou 2001, a new version of A6 with online support, was released for PS2 in 2001 and followed by several expansion packs.

The most recently released game in the core series, A7, was released in 2005 for Windows-based PCs in Japanese. A Traditional Chinese translation was released in July 2006. However, the Chinese version does not include the original Japanese train, and some unrealistic fiction trains are added. A7 is advertised as an homage to the 10th anniversary of AIV and uses a trimetric interface, instead of the open 3D interface of A5 and A6.
