= New York State Route 3C =

New York State Route 3C may refer to:

- New York State Route 3C (1930–1932) in Cayuga, Oswego, and Jefferson Counties
- New York State Route 3C (1932–1935) in Monroe County
