= European route E003 =

Road in trans-European E-road network

E003

Route information
- Length: 1,006 km (625 mi)

Major junctions
- From: Uchkuduk
- To: Gaudan

Location
- Countries: Uzbekistan; Turkmenistan

Highway system
- International E-road network; A Class; B Class

E 003 is a European B class road in Turkmenistan and Uzbekistan, connecting the cities Uchkuduk – Daşoguz – Ashgabat – Gaudan. This route is not signposted in any form.

== Route ==
- Uzbekistan
  - Uchkuduk
- Turkmenistan
  - Daşoguz
  - Ashgabat
  - Gaudan
