= Samsung Galaxy A03 =

2021 Android smartphones from Samsung

Samsung Galaxy A03 Samsung Galaxy A03s Samsung Galaxy A03 Core

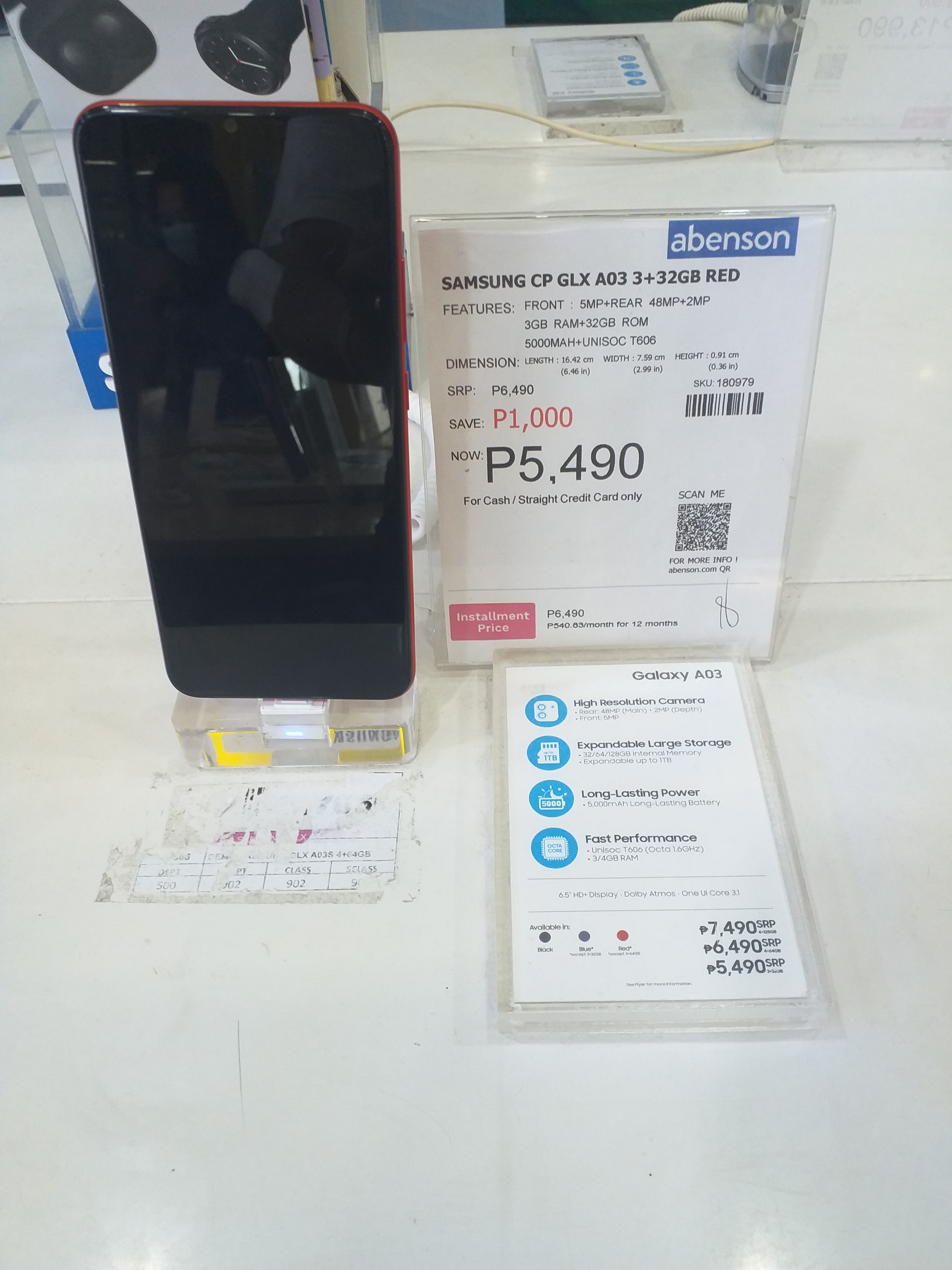
- Samsung Galaxy A03
- Brand: Samsung Galaxy
- Manufacturer: Samsung
- Type: Smartphone
- Series: Samsung Galaxy A series
- First released: A03s: August 18, 2021; 5 years ago A03 Core: November 15, 2021; 5 years ago A03: November 26, 2021; 4 years ago
- Availability by region: A03s: August 18, 2021; 5 years ago A03 Core: December 6, 2021; 4 years ago A03: January 21, 2022; 4 years ago
- Predecessor: Samsung Galaxy A02; Samsung Galaxy A02s
- Successor: Samsung Galaxy A04
- Compatible networks: List: Technology: GSM / HSPA / LTE; 2G bands; All: GSM 850 / 900 / 1800 / 1900; 3G bands; A03/A03 Core: HSDPA 850 / 900 / 2100; A03s: HSDPA 850 / 900 / 2100; HSDPA 850 / 900 / 1700(AWS) / 1900 / 2100 - SM-A037U; 4G bands (LTE); A03/A03 Core: 1, 3, 5, 7, 8, 20, 28, 38, 40, 41; A03s: 1, 3, 5, 7, 8, 20, 28, 38, 40, 41; 2, 4, 5, 7, 12, 13, 14, 25, 26, 41, 66, 71 - SM-A037U; Speed: A03/A03s: HSPA 42.2/5.76 Mbps, LTE Cat4 150/50 Mbps; A03 Core: HSPA 21.1/5.76 Mbps, LTE
- Form factor: Slate
- Dimensions: A03: 164.1 mm (6.46 in) H 75.9 mm (2.99 in) W 9.1 mm (0.36 in) D; A03s/A03 Core: 164.2 mm (6.46 in) H 75.9 mm (2.99 in) W 9.1 mm (0.36 in) D
- Weight: A03/A03s: 196 g (6.9 oz); A03 Core: 211 g (7.4 oz)
- Operating system: A03/A03s: Android 11 with One UI Core 3.1 (Upgradeable to Android 13 with One UI Core 5); A03 Core: Android 11 (Go edition) (Upgradeable to Android 13 (Go edition))
- System-on-chip: A03: Unisoc T606 (12nm); A03s: MediaTek MT6765 Helio P35 (12nm) A03 Core: Unisoc SC9863A (28nm)
- CPU: A03: Octa-core (2x 1.6GHz Cortex-A75 & 6x1.6 GHz Cortex-A55); A03s: Octa-core (4x2.35 GHz Cortex-A53 & 4x1.8 GHz Cortex-A53); A03 Core: Octa-core (4x1.6 GHz Cortex-A55 & 4x1.2 GHz Cortex-A55)
- GPU: A03: Mali-G57 MP1; A03s: PowerVR GE8320; A03 Core: IMG8322
- Memory: A03/A03s: 3 GB or 4 GB; A03 Core: 2 GB
- Storage: 32 GB, 64 GB or 128 GB
- Removable storage: microSD
- SIM: Single SIM (Nano-SIM) or Dual SIM (Nano-SIM, dual stand-by)
- Battery: Li-Po 5000 mAh
- Charging: A03: 10W Standard Charging; A03s: 15W Adaptive Fast Charging
- Rear camera: A03: Primary: Hynix Hi-4821Q; 48 MP, f/1.8, (wide), 1/2.0", 0.8µm, AF; Depth: GalaxyCore GC2375H; 2 MP, f/2.4, 1/5.0", 1.75μm; A03s: Primary: 13 MP, f/2.2, (wide), AF; Macro: 2 MP, f/2.4; Depth: 2 MP, f/2.4; A03 Core: 8 MP, f/2.0, AF; All: LED flash; 1080p@30fps
- Front camera: GalaxyCore GC5035; 5 MP, f/2.2, (wide), 1/5.0", 1.12µm; 1080p@30fps
- Display: 6.5 in (170 mm), HD; PLS IPS; Infinity-V Display (1600x720 pixels)
- Sound: Loudspeaker; 3.5mm jack Dolby Atmos
- Connectivity: Wi-Fi 802.11 a/b/g/n/ac, Wi-Fi Direct, hotspot Bluetooth 5.1, A2DP, LE
- Data inputs: Multi-touch screen; USB Type-C 2.0 (A03s); microUSB 2.0 (A03, A03 Core); Accelerometer; Proximity sensor
- Model: SM-A032x, SM-A035x, SM-A037x (last letter varies by carrier and international models)

The Samsung Galaxy A03 is a series of Android-based smartphones manufactured by Samsung Electronics that includes the base A03, A03s and A03 Core. The A03 was first announced on November 25, 2021. The A03s was first announced on August 18, 2021, followed by the Core variant on December 6, 2021.

== Specifications ==
=== Design ===
All models use a plastic back and frame along with a glass front.

Galaxy A03 Core	Galaxy A03	Galaxy A03s
Black; Blue	Black; Blue; Red	Black; Blue; Red; White

=== Hardware ===
==== Display ====
All three devices have a 6.5-inch PLS TFT capacitive touchscreen with a resolution of 1600×720 pixels.

==== Camera ====
The Galaxy A03 has a dual rear camera setup: a 48 MP wide lens and th 2 MP depth sensor. The main camera can record video up at 1080p @ 30 fps. A single 5 MP front-facing camera is present in a notch.

The Galaxy A03 Core only has a single 8 MP rear camera and 5 MP front-facing camera. The Galaxy A03s have a triple rear camera setup: 13 MP wide, macro and depth sensors with 2 MP each.

==== Processor and memory ====
The Galaxy A03 uses the UNISOC T606 octa-core processor, while the Core and "s" variants use the UNISOC SC9863A and MediaTek Helio P35, respectively.

RAM options include 3 GB or 4 GB, with storage ranging from 32 GB to 128 GB for the A03. The "s" variant offers the same RAM options but is limited to 32 GB or 64 GB of storage. The Core variant is available only with 2 GB of RAM and 32 GB of storage. All devices uses the same eMMC storage type. All devices also include a microSDXC slot, allowing users to expand their storage capacity up to 1 TB.

==== Battery ====
All variants have a Li-Po 5000 mAh non-removable battery. Only the A03s has 15W Fast Charging support.

=== Software ===
The Galaxy A03 & A03s originally came with Android 11 and One UI Core 3.1 pre-installed. The Galaxy A03s have the same pre-installed OS and One UI version as with the other devices, albeit it uses the Android Go edition of the OS. Like its predecessors, it is slated to receive 2 OS upgrades and 4 years of security updates.

	Pre-installed OS	OS Upgrades history		End of support
	Pre-installed OS	1st	2nd	End of support
A03 Core	Android 11 (Android Go) (One UI Core 3.1)	Android 12 (Android Go) (One UI Core 4.0); March 2023	Android 13 (Android Go) (One UI Core 5.1); September 2023	January 2026
A03	Android 11 (One UI Core 3.1)	Android 12 (One UI Core 4.1); August 2022	Android 13 (One UI Core 5.0); January 2023	February 2026
A03s	Android 11 (One UI Core 3.1)	Android 12 (One UI Core 4.1); July 2022	Android 13 (One UI Core 5.0); December 2022	October 2025

Preceded by Samsung Galaxy A02	Samsung Galaxy A03; 2021	Succeeded by Samsung Galaxy A04
