= Spokane, Portland and Seattle class O-2 =

Spokane, Portland & Seattle Railway O-2 class
Type and origin
- Power type: Steam
- Builder: Schenectady Locomotive Works
- Serial number: 46878
- Build date: February 1910
Specifications
- Configuration
  - Whyte: 2-8-2
- Gauge: 4 ft 8 1/2 in (1,435 mm)
- Driver dia.: 63 in (1.600 m)
- Adhesive weight: 207,000 lb (94 t)
- Loco weight: 265,000 lb (120 t)
- Fuel type: Oil
- Boiler pressure: 200 psi (1.38 MPa)
- Cylinders: Two
- Cylinder size: 25 inches
Performance figures
- Tractive effort: 50,600 lbf (225.1 kN)
Career
- Operators: Spokane, Portland and Seattle Railway
- Class: O-2
- Locale: United States

On the American Spokane, Portland and Seattle Railway, locomotive number 525 was the only steam locomotive in SP&S class O-2. It was originally built for Northern Pacific by the Schenectady Locomotive Works. Builders number 46878 was built in February 1910.

== Background ==
In the early 1920s the SP&S had experienced an increase in traffic, especially logging traffic off the Portland, Astoria and Pacific and United Railways west of Portland, Oregon. To help handle this tonnage, several locomotives were leased from the Great Northern Railway and Northern Pacific Railway. To offset these costs, several of these locomotives were sold by the parent roads to the SP&S. Number 525 was one of these locomotives.

== Operational history ==
Number 525 was officially bought by the SP&S on November 30, 1925. It was used on the mainline because it was able to haul heavier eastbound trains upgrade out of Pasco, Washington. Over time, as newer locomotives were obtained by the SP&S, number 525 was demoted to local or work service, or used on doubleheaded mainline trains. By late 1942 and early 1943, 525 was assigned to the Vancouver, Washington, yard as a switch locomotive. Number 525 was finally scrapped in 1947.

== Numbering ==
SP&S number 525 was originally NP number 1698, in class W-1.

== Disposition ==
SP&S Number 525 was dismantled on October 31, 1947.
