= Spokane, Portland and Seattle class E-1 =

Class of American 4-8-4 locomotives

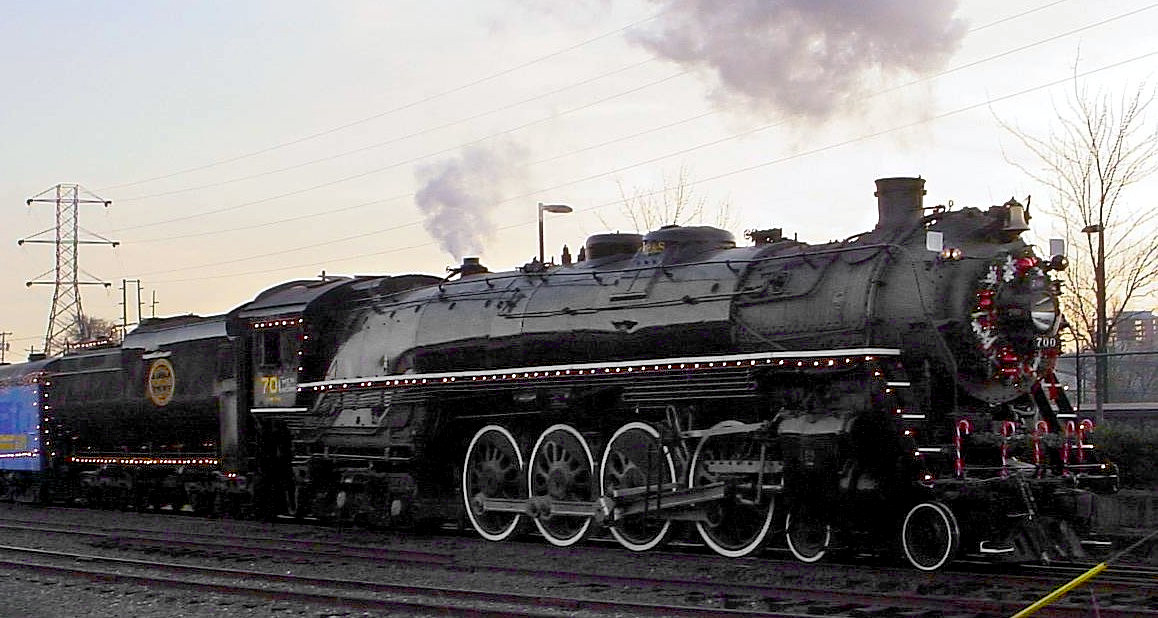
- SP&S No. 700 on a Christmas excursion in December 2005
Type and origin
- Power type: Steam
- Builder: Baldwin Locomotive Works
- Serial number: 62171–62173
- Build date: 1938
- Total produced: 3
Specifications
- Configuration
  - Whyte: 4-8-4
  - UIC: 2′D2′ h2
- Gauge: 4 ft 8 1/2 in (1,435 mm)
- Driver dia.: 77 in (1,956 mm)
- Axle load: 77,200 lb (35.0 tonnes)
- Adhesive weight: 294,500 lb (133.6 tonnes)
- Loco weight: 485,820 lb (220.36 tonnes)
- Total weight: 879,600 lb (399.0 tonnes)
- Fuel type: Oil
- Boiler pressure: 260 psi (1.8 MPa)
- Cylinders: Two
- Cylinder size: 28 in × 32 in (710 mm × 810 mm)
- Valve gear: Walschaerts
Performance figures
- Maximum speed: 110 mph / 170 km per hour
- Tractive effort: 69,800 lbf (310.49 kN)
Career
- Operators: Spokane, Portland and Seattle Railway
- Class: E-1
- Number in class: 3
- Numbers: 700–702
- Retired: 1956
- Preserved: No. 700 preserved, Nos. 701 and 702 scrapped
- Restored: No. 700; May 15, 1990
- Current owner: The City of Portland, Oregon (No. 700)
- Disposition: No. 700 operational condition

Spokane Portland and Seattle Railway's E-1 class is a class of the only three 4-8-4 locomotives built by the Baldwin Locomotive Works in 1938. The E-1 class "Northerns" were very similar to the A-2 through the A-5 class "Northerns" on the Northern Pacific Railroad built by Baldwin from 1934–1943. Visually, the locos are near-identical. The only difference is that the Northern Pacific Railroad 4-8-4s burn coal and the 4-8-4s on the Spokane, Portland and Seattle Railroad burn oil (and have a longer range as a result). They were typically used on passenger trains, with the exception of No. 701 which typically pulled freight trains except when needed to take over from 700 or 702.

== Preservation ==
Nos. 701 and 702 were not preserved. No. 700 headed the railroad's final steam working on May 20, 1956 and was sent for scrap after, until later being donated by the railroad to the city of Portland in January 1958 in response to Union Pacific's offering to the city of their No. 3203, and was restored in 1990 by its current maintainer and operator, the Pacific Railroad Preservation Association. Since mid-2012, No. 700 resides at the Oregon Rail Heritage Center in Portland, Oregon for public viewing.

== Roster ==
Number	Baldwin serial number	Date built	Disposition	Notes
700	62171	1938	Operational, based in Portland, Oregon.	Sole surviving original SP&S steam locomotive.
701	62172	1938	Sold for scrap 1956	
702	62173	1938	Sold for scrap 1956	
