= Spokane, Portland and Seattle class A3 =

A-3
Type and origin
- Power type: Steam
- Builder: Alco-Schenectady
- Build date: January 1914
Specifications
- Configuration
  - Whyte: 0-6-0
- Gauge: 4 ft 8 1/2 in (1,435 mm)
- Driver dia.: 51 in (1,295 mm)
- Loco weight: 153,800 lb (69.8 t)
- Fuel type: Oil
- Boiler pressure: 165 lbf/in^{2} (1.14 MPa)
- Cylinders: Two
- Cylinder size: 20 in × 26 in (508 mm × 660 mm)
Performance figures
- Tractive effort: 31,200 lbf (138.78 kN)
Career
- Operators: Spokane, Portland and Seattle Railway
- Class: A-3
- Locale: United States
- Retired: 1952

Spokane, Portland and Seattle Railway's Class A-3 was a class of 0-6-0 steam locomotive switchers.
