= List of highways numbered 3A =

The following roads are numbered 3A:

== Canada ==
- Alberta Highway 3A
- British Columbia Highway 3A
- Manitoba Highway 3A
- Newfoundland and Labrador Route 3A (Team Gushue Highway)
- Nova Scotia Trunk 3A (former)

== United States ==
- Massachusetts Route 3A
- Nevada State Route 3A (former)
- New Hampshire Route 3A
- County Route 3A (Monmouth County, New Jersey) (former)
- New York State Route 3A
- Oklahoma State Highway 3A
- Texas Park Road 3A

Territories

- Guam Highway 3A

Browse numbered routes
| ← Route 6 | N.E. | → Route 6B |
