= Samtrak =

Heritage railroad that operated in Oregon from 1993 to 2001

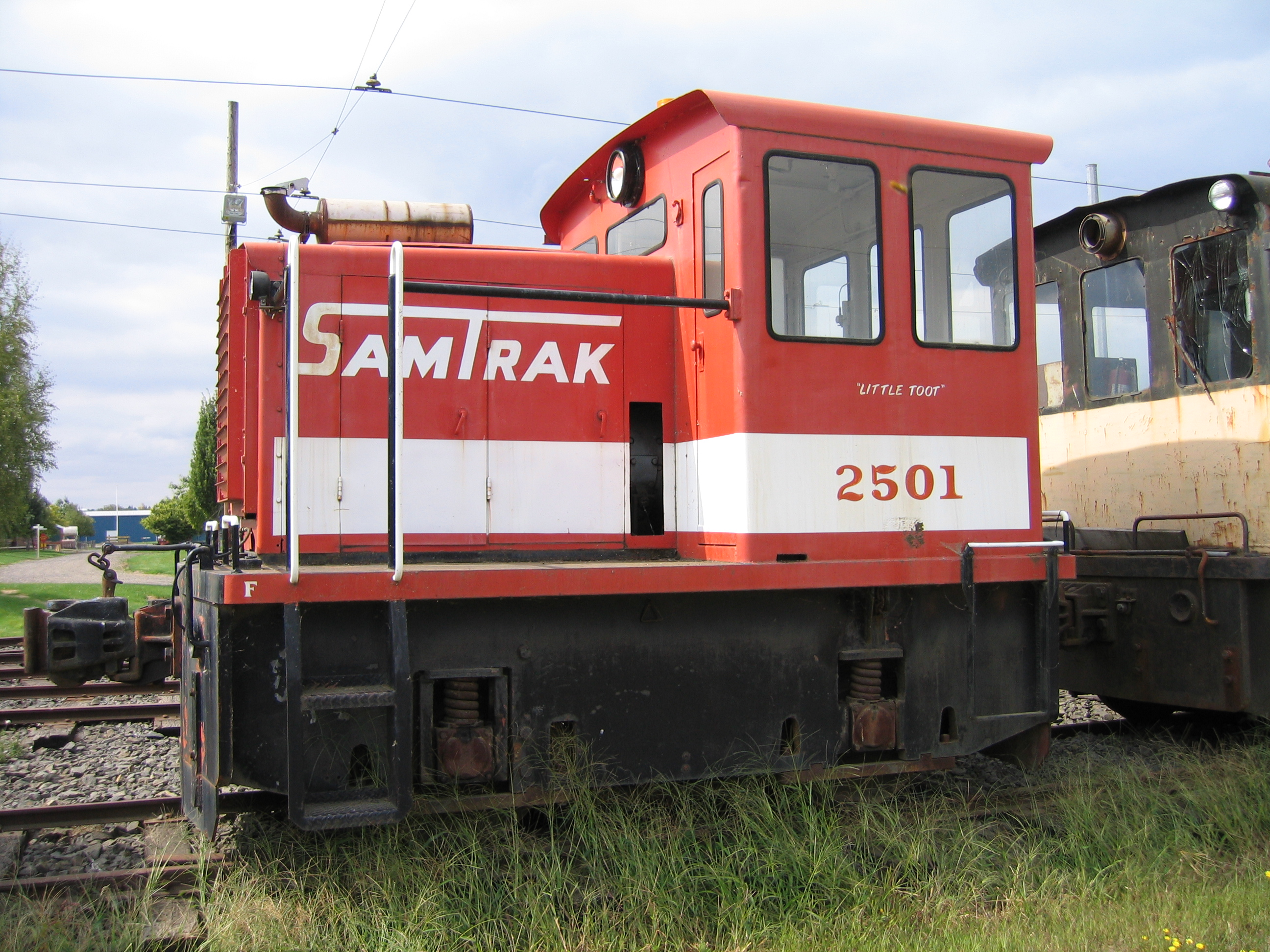
Samtrak engine

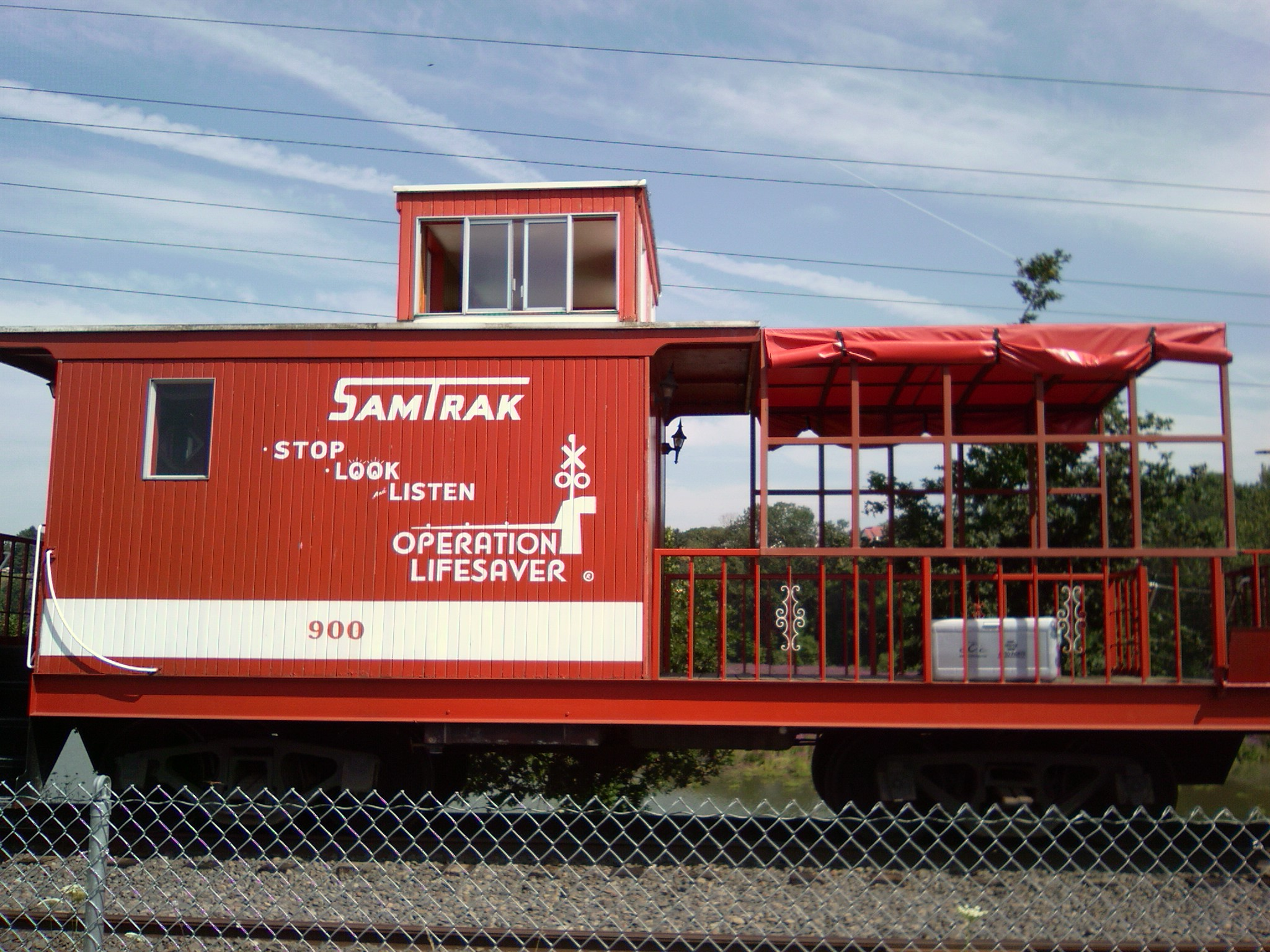
Samtrak caboose

Samtrak was a heritage railroad that operated in Oregon from 1993 to 2001.

Samtrak was a passenger train operated by the Oregon Pacific Railroad, and named after the owner of the railroad, Dick Samuels. The trains ran a 3.8 mile route from OMSI to the foot of S.E. 11th Avenue, with a stop at Oaks Amusement Park. At the 11th Avenue end of the route, the railroad owned a building used by the former Portland Traction Company railroad and began a small railroad museum with a variety of historic diesel locomotives. While the museum was not built and the building sold, the Oregon Pacific Railroad kept the locomotives; Samuels remained committed to a railroad museum in Portland and had a proposal for such a museum to be located near Oaks Park (itself intended to have been a railroad museum, featuring the three steam locomotives donated to the City of Portland: the Southern Pacific 4449, the Spokane, Portland & Seattle 700, and the Union Pacific 3203). In 2012, the dream was realized as the Oregon Rail Heritage Center.

The original cost to ride Samtrak was $3. In 1995, the cost was increased to $4.

Samtrak ran Tuesday through Sunday during the summer and for special events and holidays, such as Memorial Day and Holiday Junction at OMSI.

The passenger excursion train originally consisted of a 25-ton General Electric diesel locomotive, but was later upgraded to a 45-ton GE locomotive, and an open-air passenger car. In June 1994, the railway purchased an antique 1926 caboose from the Northern Pacific Railway and added it to the train. Riding in the cupola of the caboose cost an extra dollar.

After Samtrak stopped running, the original 25-ton diesel locomotive and the open passenger car were stored by the Oregon Pacific Railroad until donated to the Oregon Electric Railway Historical Society in May 2005. The open-air passenger car however was returned to the Oregon Pacific Railroad. Although the SamTrak trains no longer run, the Oregon Pacific Railroad has continued to host excursions using the Southern Pacific 4449 and Spokane, Portland and Seattle 700 steam locomotives.

The 45-ton locomotive was sold in 2009 to the Port of Tillamook Bay Railroad to assist in rebuilding their railroad; however the POTB later chose to abandon that effort. The locomotive was sold again.
