= Polson Logging Co. 2 =

Preserved American 2-8-2 steam locomotive

Polson Logging Company 2
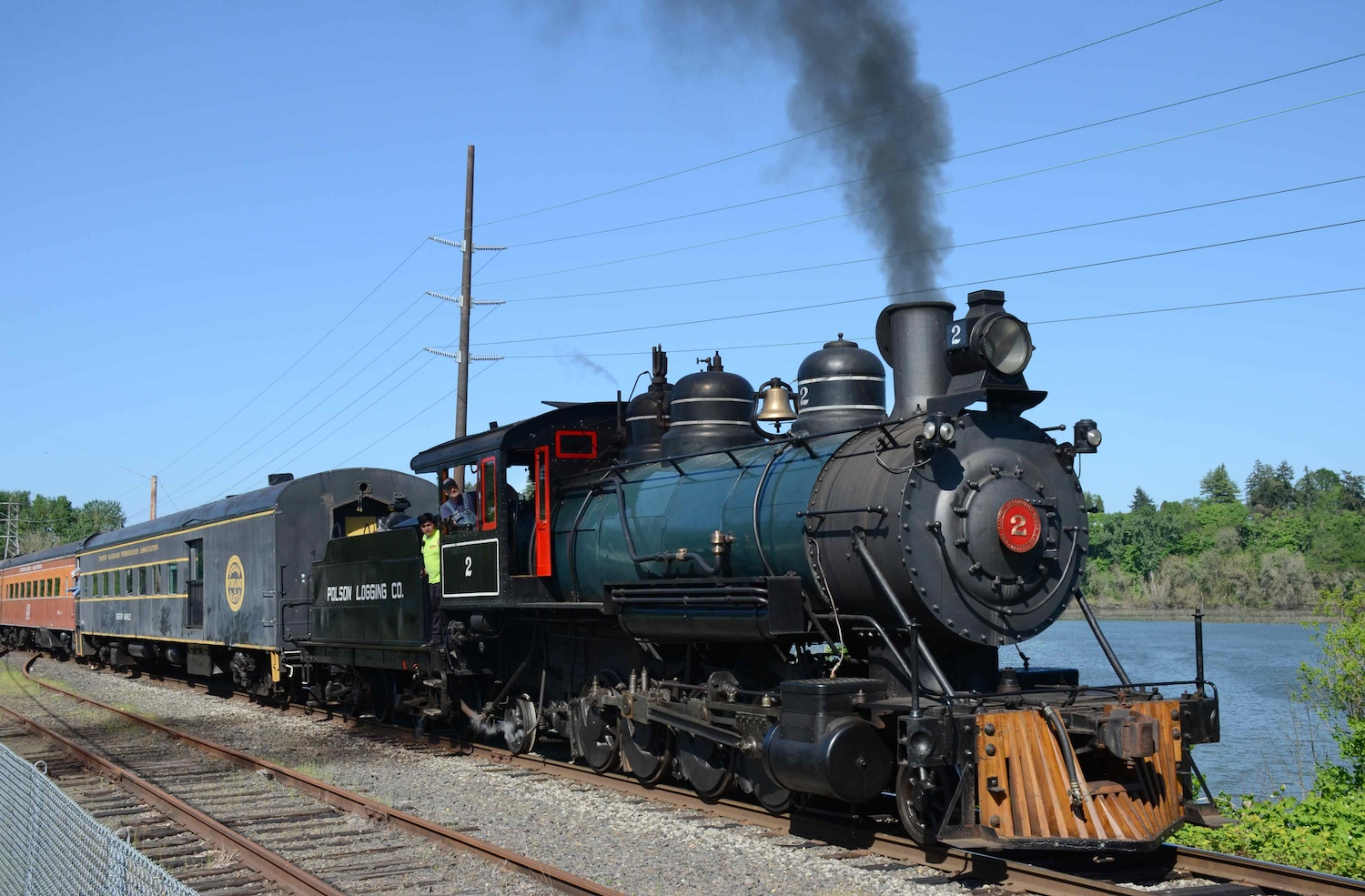
- Polson Logging 2 heading an excursion train in Portland, Oregon, in 2023, while on loan to the Oregon Rail Heritage Foundation
Type and origin
- Power type: Steam
- Builder: Baldwin Locomotive Works
- Serial number: 38967
- Build date: December 1912
Specifications
- Configuration
  - Whyte: 2-8-2
  - UIC: 1′D’1 h2
- Gauge: 4 ft 8 1/2 in (1,435 mm)
- Driver dia.: 44 in (1.118 m)
- Wheelbase: 50.46 ft (1,538 cm)
  - Engine: 27.25 ft (831 cm)
  - Drivers: 12.08 ft (368 cm)
- Adhesive weight: 113,550 lb (56.78 short tons; 51,510 kg)
- Loco weight: 141,150 lb (70.58 short tons; 64,020 kg)
- Tender weight: 70,000 lb (35 short tons; 32,000 kg)
- Total weight: 211,150 lb (105.58 short tons; 95,780 kg)
- Fuel type: Oil
- Fuel capacity: 1,600 imp gal (7,300 L; 1,900 US gal)
- Water cap.: 3,500 imp gal (16,000 L; 4,200 US gal)
- Firebox
  - Grate area: 25.50 sq ft (2.369 m^{2})
- Boiler pressure: 180 psi (1.24 MPa)
- Heating surface
  - Firebox: 140 sq ft (13 m^{2})
- Cylinders: Two, outside
- Cylinder size: 18 in × 24 in (457 mm × 610 mm)
- Valve gear: Stephenson
- Valve type: Piston valves
- Loco brake: Air
- Train brakes: Air
- Couplers: Knuckle
Performance figures
- Power output: 5,243 PS (3,860 kW; 5,170 hp)
- Tractive effort: 27,039 lbf (120.28 kN)
- Factor of adh.: 4.20
Career
- Operators: Saginaw Timber Company; North Western Lumber Company; Polson Logging Company; Rayonier, Inc.; Cadillac and Lake City Railroad; Kettle Moraine Scenic Railway; Mid-Continent Railway Museum; Oregon Coast Scenic Railroad; Oregon Rail Heritage Foundation (leased); Albany and Eastern Railroad
- Numbers: PLC 2
- Nicknames: Saginaw Engine
- Retired: 1971
- Restored: 1987
- Current owner: Rick Franklin
- Disposition: Operational

Polson Logging Company 2 is a 2-8-2 "Mikado" type steam locomotive built in December 1912 by the Baldwin Locomotive Works (BLW). It was originally built for the Saginaw Timber Company to pull logging trains. After that, it went through several ownership changes throughout both the steam era and the preservation era, before it was purchased by caretaker Skip Lichter in 1982. Lichter restored Polson Lumber 2 to operational condition and loaned it to the Mid-Continent Railway Museum (MCRY) in North Freedom, Wisconsin. The engine was later removed from service in 2000 to undergo a federally-mandated rebuild. Disagreement over who should cover the restoration costs ultimately led to an arbiter finding in Lichter's favor.

After a 16-year restoration process, Polson Logging 2 returned to full steam in 2016. It was moved to the Oregon Coast Scenic Railroad the next year to operate on the railroad in Garibaldi, Oregon. As of 2023, it is owned by Rick Franklin, and it is stored at the Oregon Rail Heritage Center (ORHC) for use in pulling their Christmas trains to Oaks Park. It was set be moved to the Albany and Eastern Railroad some time in 2023, until a boiler tube leak prompted ORHC to commence the 15-year overhaul of the locomotive's boiler.

== History ==
=== Revenue service ===
The Saginaw Timber Company was formed in 1908, and its purpose was to operate logging trains through forests along the Chehalis River in the state of Washington. Initially, the company used geared Shay and Climax engines to pull the trains. However, Saginaw Timber decided they needed a larger and more conventional engine with greater power and speed to handle their logging loads. Hence, in December 1912, the Baldwin Locomotive Works (BLW) of Philadelphia, Pennsylvania constructed a brand new 2-8-2 Mikado for Saginaw Timber, which was No. 2. It was designed with four flangeless center drivers, in order for it to negotiate with tight 30-degree curves, and it was built as an oil burner, in order to prevent forest fires normally caused by coal ash. No. 2 had a design flaw on the equalising beams between the rear trailing axle and the drivers, which were prone to breaking. This flaw was later fixed, when the beams were modified with thicker materials. Once No. 2 was delivered to Washington, Saginaw Timber put the locomotive into use on pulling their logging trains on the company's 40-mile (64 km) route.

In 1924, Saginaw Timber agreed to trade No. 2 for a larger steam engine with the North Western Lumber Company, and No. 2 was subsequently moved to North Western Lumber's location in Hoquiam, Washington. From there, No. 2 was reassigned to pull the North Western's logging trains in and out of Hoquiam until 1939. That year, the Polson Logging Company, which also ran out of Hoquiam, struck a deal with North Western Lumber, and despite their financial struggle from the Great Depression, Polson succeeded to purchase No. 2. The Polson Company already owned two other mikado engines that were based on No. 2's design, Nos. 70 and 101, but they didn’t perform as well as No. 2 did. No. 2 was reassigned again to take logs from New London, a logging area that earned the nickname Log City, to the company's lumber mills in Hoquiam. In 1948, the Polson Logging Company was bought out by Rayonier Incorporated, which inherited Polson's steam engines. Rayonier continued to use the engines to pull logging trains, until the early 1960s. By which time, diesel engines have replaced steam power in most commercial railroads, and most logging companies in the Pacific Northwest have switched to shipping logs by truck.

=== Early preservation ===
In March 1962, No. 2 was sold to the Grand Traverse Northern Corporation of Marquette, Michigan, which was in search for a steam engine to use on their new tourist operation, the Cadillac and Lake City Railroad (CLK) of Cadillac, Michigan. No. 2 was towed from Hoquiam, Washington to Cadillac for over 2,300 miles on mainline trackage owned by the Northern Pacific and Soo Line Railroads. After a subsequent restoration process was completed in May 1965, No. 2 began pulling the C&LC's 4-mile tourist trains between Lake City and Cadillac. It also ran alongside Ex-Kelly Island Lime and Transport saddle tank engine No. 11. In 1970, No. 2 developed a crack in its boiler shell, and it was sidelined for repairs, while Canadian Pacific 1278 was leased from Steamtown, U.S.A. as a stand-in. Concurrently, the C&LC was facing a slow decline in ridership, and it led to the railroad discontinuing their Michigan operations in 1971. No. 2 was subsequently sold to Carl U., who was the son-in-law of Richard Hinebaugh, the owner and operator of the Kettle Moraine Scenic Railway in North Lake, Wisconsin. Carl was allowed to operate the No. 2 on the Kettle Moraine for two years, before further mechanical problems sidelined it. The engine was later sold again to H. Stuart Kuyper of Pella, Iowa, who wanted to use No. 2 to pull his own dinner excursions. Kuyper had No. 2 moved to the Illinois Railway Museum (IRM) in Union, Illinois for restoration, but before restoration work could be completed, Kuyper died in 1980.

=== Mid-Continent Railway Museum ===
In October 1982, No. 2 was purchased by steam engine enthusiast and Mid-Continent Railway Museum (MCRY) member Roland "Skip" Lichter, who thought No. 2 was a good candidate for use to pull tourist trains. Lichter had No. 2 moved to the Mid-Continent Railway Museum of North Freedom, Wisconsin. A long-term loan was signed where No. 2 would be operated by the Museum alongside their own engines, such as Chicago and North Western No. 1385 and Western Coal and Coke Company No. 1. Work began by Lichter and Mid-Continent crews to repair the engine and bring it back to service. Lichter also had the engine repainted to resemble its first livery from the Saginaw Timber Company. Restoration work was completed in 1987, and No. 2 began pulling the Museum's tourist trains on their Ex-Chicago and North Western line between North Freedom and Quartzite Lake. Such trips include the yearly Snow Train in February and the Autumn Color Train in the fall. Crews and visitors of the MCRM began to refer No. 2 as the "Saginaw Engine". In the early 1990s, however, tension was beginning to grow between Lichter and the MCRM; Lichter sued the Museum, alleging they were not maintaining or cleaning the engine, and they were not repaying him for maintenance costs. In 1999, No. 2 was relettered to Polson Logging Company, out of respect for the third operator in the engine’s history. In February of the following year, No. 2 pulled the MCRM's annual Snow Train before it was removed from service, since the engine was in poor mechanical condition, and it had to be rebuilt to comply with the new FRA steam standards.

"This was not an easy decision to make. It was not a black-and-white situation and there are several issues that had to be considered. All options were looked at. In the best interest of the museum, the financial liabilities had to take priority. Lease costs with the obligation of 15 years for maintenance and with no warranties whatsoever was the main reason that made the decision necessary."

— Unnamed Mid-Continent Railway Museum board member

Beginning in 2001, the engine was disassembled with the boiler shipped to a shop complex in Milwaukee, Wisconsin to be rebuilt. While Lichter and his crew began giving the engine a thorough overhaul, a court-approved stipulation was made in 2003 where the MCRM would lease and operate No. 2 for 15 years after the engine's rebuild was finished. Ever since No. 2 was taken out of service in 2000, the MCRM was left with no operational steam engines on their property, which lost the Museum their critical tourist draw; the only exception was during one week in August 2011, when the museum borrowed Flagg Coal Co. 75 for a small series of events. The thorough rebuild on No. 2 took more than 14 years to complete. On October 10, 2014, No. 2 was towed out of the Museum’s building to undergo a boiler test-fire, and it was deemed a success. Additional work was performed on the engine, before it made a small series of test runs on the MCRM's trackage, and it became FRA certified to run again in May 2016. Shortly afterward, however, the MCRM's board of directors started to express financial concerns over leasing and operating Lichter's engine; the MCRM’s President, Jeff Bloohm, explained that the board’s primary concern was that the Museum would be immediately responsible for all costly repairs made to No. 2, and Lichter would not be required to give them warranties for the workmanship of repairs.

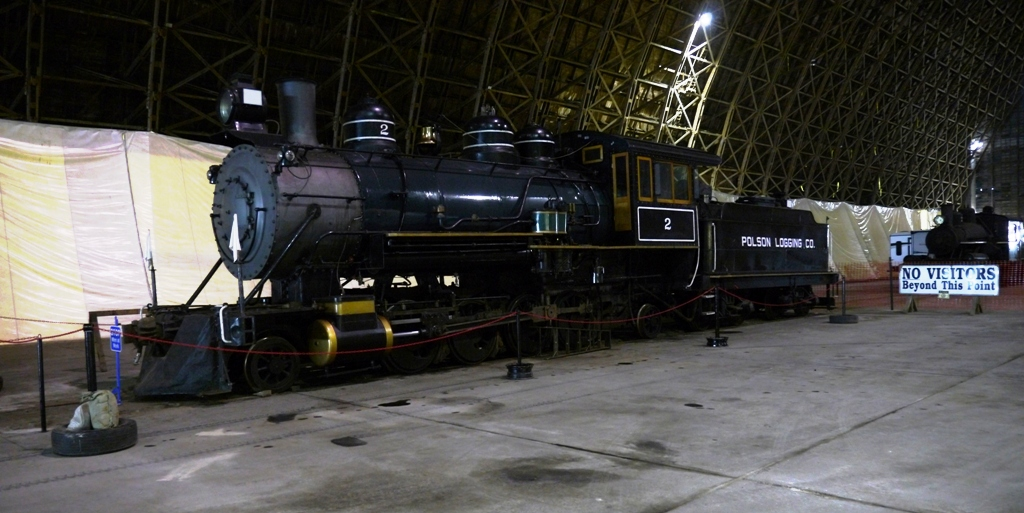
Polson Logging Company No. 2 at the Tillamook Air Museum

The Museum was also committed to restore their No. 1385 engine to service by 2018—No. 1385 is still undergoing restoration, as of 2026—so the Museum could easily run their own steam power, as opposed to engines owned by private individuals, like Lichter; they believed they could not operate two steam engines at the same time, because of high costs. Therefore, the MCRM's board of directors voted on December 10, 2016, that the Museum would not be operating No. 2, despite the engine being ready for service again. Lichter was distraught over the museum making the decision without any input from him. He wanted to see his engine run again near his home, but the MCRM would not operate it for him. He also felt the need for warranties was unnecessary, as he and his crew performed the work on No. 2 themselves. An arbitrator by the name of William Parker was asked to settle the dispute between Lichter and the MCRM over lease terms and restoration costs. On February 10, 2017, Parker founded in Lichter's favor and ruled that the MCRM had to pay Lichter $200,000 in restoration costs. He explained that the Museum violated the 2003 lease agreement by not running No. 2.

"Mid-Continent had an obligation arising out of the stipulation to work with Lichter to overhaul the engine. Essentially [Mid-Continent] failed to fulfill this commitment and eventually repudiated the stipulation. [The museum’s] attempt to void the lease, let alone some of the spurious reasons put forward to justify it, could almost certainly have been avoided."

— William Parker

Parker also ruled that the Museum had to pay Lichter for legal fees and for the cost of shipping No. 2 to another location in the Continental United States that Lichter desired. From there, Lichter and his family, albeit sad to leave North Freedom behind, began seeking other places in the country to move to while taking No. 2 with them. Over 20 different museums and tourist railroads in different states were considered for the engine to operate on. By July 2017, Lichter struck a deal with the Oregon Coast Scenic Railroad (OCSR), which owns and operates McCloud Railway 25 and Heisler engines No. 2 and No. 3 on the Ex-Southern Pacific Tillamook Branch. Lichter expressed that the OCSR was willing to be partners with him, and that was what he was after, as opposed to management making decisions without his blessing.

"I want to be able to run it, I want it to perform. To do what it’s supposed to do to. Let the people enjoy it. Let the public enjoy it. I feel like I’m the caretaker for it. When I pass away, my family will take care of it."

— Skip Lichter

No. 2 would have had to be shipped to the Railroad's location in Garibaldi, Oregon from North Freedom for over 2,000 miles by truck, and it was estimated that it would cost the MCRM around $75,000. On October 2 and 3, with the help of crews from the OCSR, No. 2 was lifted and loaded onto a truck trailer, with its tender loaded onto a second one, and some spare wheels and parts were loaded onto a third one a few days later.

=== Career in Oregon ===
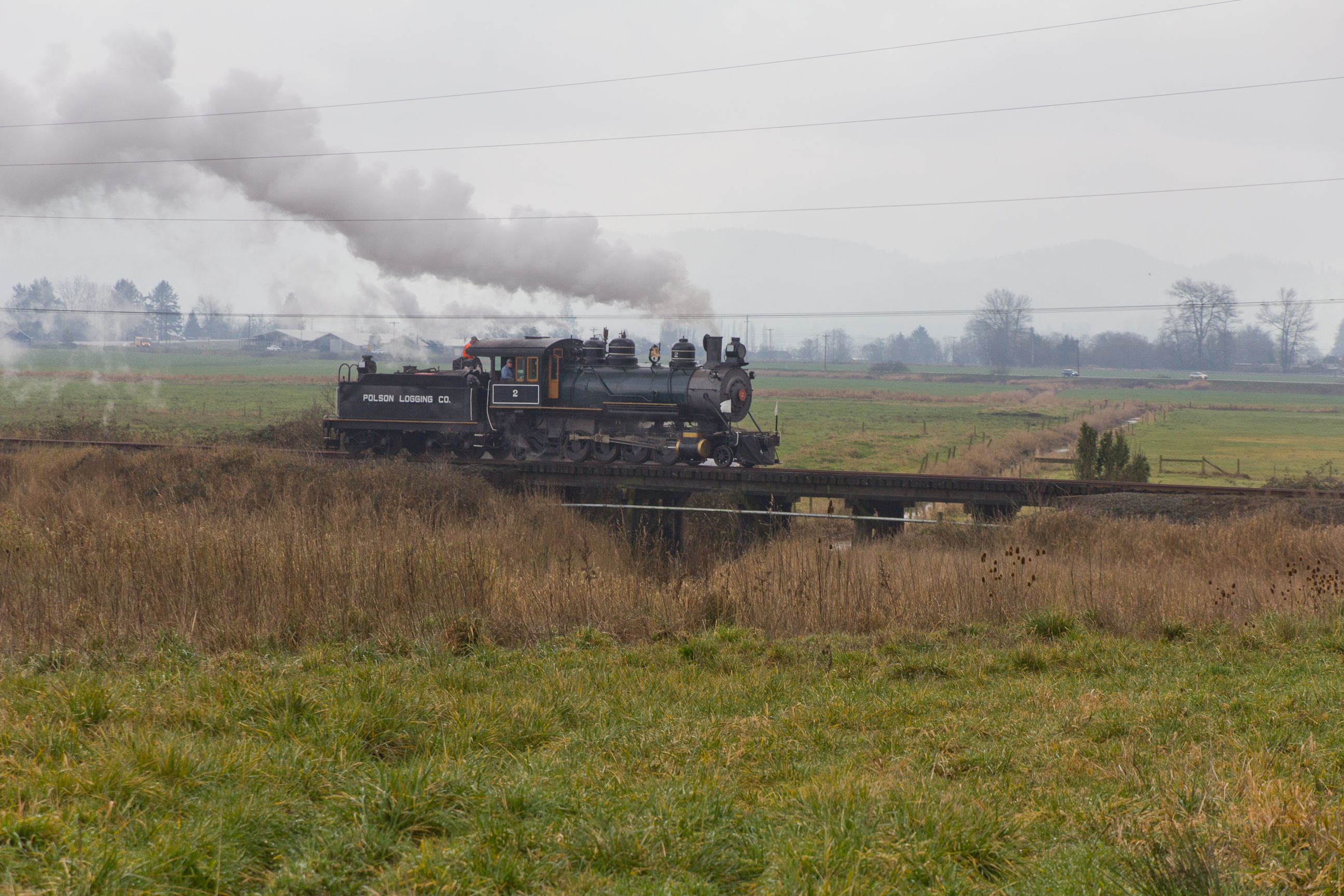
Polson Logging Company No. 2 making its first test run on the Oregon Coast Scenic Railroad on December 15, 2017

By the end of October 2017, No. 2 was loaded back onto rails upon arrival in Tillamook, Oregon, and it was temporarily stored inside a shed building for some minor repairs to take place. The engine was placed into service on the OCSR in May 2018, and it began pulling yearly tourist trains between Garibaldi and Rockaway Beach. It also took part in occasional photo charters, such as a March 2019 charter that was dedicated to Columbia River Belt Line Railway No. 7 "Skookum" returning to service. During the offseason, #2 would be displayed inside the Tillamook Air Museum, safely out of the weather. On November 10, 2021, Skip Lichter died at the age of 79, and a trust that consisted of his three children, Dan Lichter, Jill Keeker, and Sue Barker, inherited ownership of No. 2. The trio intended to respect their father's wishes and keep No. 2 operational. They considered selling the engine to another owner to take care of it. In August 2022, No. 2 was sold to Rick Franklin, the owner and operator of the Albany and Eastern Railroad (AERC), where only one steam engine, Santa Maria Valley No. 205, is based.

No. 2 and its tender were once again loaded onto separate truck trailers for shipment to the Albany and Eastern's location, but the engine first landed at the Oregon Rail Heritage Center (ORHC), while a two-stall barn would be built at the Albany and Eastern to eventually house both Nos. 2 and 205. The Oregon Rail Heritage Foundation operates Southern Pacific No. 4449 and Spokane, Portland and Seattle No. 700 to pull Christmas trains on the Oregon Pacific Railroad through Oaks Park in December every year. However, their long wheelbases caused damage to the rails, and by 2022, the Oregon Pacific restricted the operation of the big 4-8-4s to Oaks Park. The ORHF compensated by obtaining ownership of Mount Emily Lumber Co. 1 from the Oregon Historical Society, but that engine requires some certified maintenance in order to run again. As the president of the ORHF, Rick Franklin decided to have No. 2 moved to the heritage center for use as a stand-in for the 2022 Oaks Park Christmas Trains. In March 2023, No. 2 was used by the ORHF again to pull a train for Saint Patrick's Day. In August 2023, a leak on one of No. 2's boiler tubes was discovered, prompting Oregon Rail Heritage Center to commence the 15-year overhaul of the locomotive's boiler, the rebuild has since been completed as of November 2023, and the locomotive returned to operating condition.

== See also ==
- Southern Railway 630
- Norfolk and Western 475
- Soo Line 1003
- St. Louis-San Francisco 1630
- Great Western 90
