= Albany and Eastern Railroad =

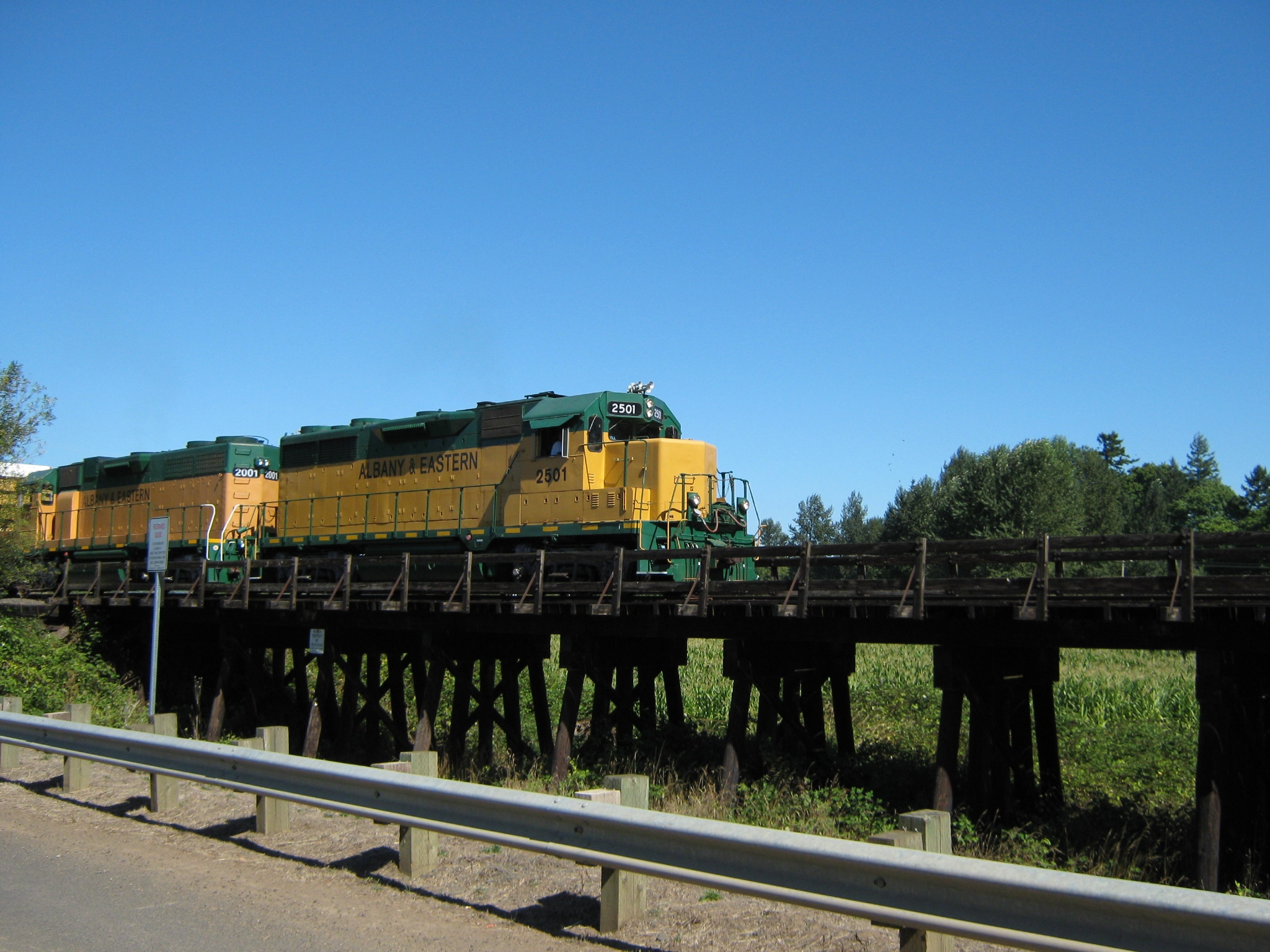

Overview
- Headquarters: Lebanon, Oregon
- Reporting mark: AERC
- Locale: Oregon
- Dates of operation: 1998–present

Technical
- Track gauge: 4 ft 8 1/2 in (1,435 mm) standard gauge
- Track length: 64 miles (103 km)

Other
- Website: albanyeastern.com

The Albany and Eastern Railroad (reporting mark AERC) is a short line railroad in the Willamette Valley of Oregon that was created when the BNSF Railway spun off its Sweet Home Branch Line in May 1998. It operates about 64 miles (103 km) of track and is based in Lebanon, Oregon. The main line runs from Albany to Lebanon, with two branch lines at Lebanon going to Sweet Home and Mill City. At the Albany end of the main line it connects to Union Pacific and BNSF lines.

== History ==
The 11 miles (18 km) of the Albany-Lebanon mainline were built by the newly founded Albany and Lebanon Railroad in 1880. The A&L was shortly thereafter bought by the Oregon and California Railroad, which ran from Portland to the Oregon-California border. In turn, the O&C was bought by Southern Pacific in 1887. The Albany-Lebanon line became one of several branches off the main route from San Francisco to Portland, which went through Albany. New branches were also constructed as the Willamette Valley industrialized, including a 36 miles (58 km) route northeast from Lebanon to the booming lumber town of Mill City built in 1910. SP leased both branch lines to the Willamette Valley Railway in 1993, and sold them outright to WVR in 1996 shortly before its acquisition by Union Pacific.

The 17 miles (27 km) Lebanon-Sweet Home branch was built by the Spokane, Portland, and Seattle Railway in 1930 as a spur of their passenger Oregon Electric Railway, and eventually acquired by BNSF. The railroad spun it off into the Albany and Eastern in May 1998.

Five years later, in 2003, AERC bought the Albany-Lebanon and Lebanon-Mill City lines from WVR, completing the current network. In 2007 a revamping of its aging infrastructure began, with new rails, ties, and rebuilt crossings. By 2011 all three lines had been refurbished.

Starting in 2014, the railroad has offered excursion and charter trains, the Santiam Excursion Trains, particularly with Santa Maria Valley Railroad 205 and Southern Pacific 5399. Polson Logging Co. 2 may join after its lease to the Oregon Rail Heritage Center.

== Fleet ==
As of 2022, the AERC roster consisted of the following:

Locomotive details
Number	Type	Built	Notes
1866	SW9	1953	EX Portland & Western; 1201 - EX Willamette & Pacific; 1201 née Pittsburg & Shawmut 232
1750	GP9	1959	1750 (Previously 3859) EX-Williamette Valley 3859 - EX SP 3859 - EX SP 3660 TNO 456
1807, 1841, 5931, 5935, 5957	B40-8	1988	1807 EX UP 5616 - EX SP 8007, 1841 EX UP 5650 - EX SSW 456, 5931, 5935, 5957 - EX CSX Same Road Numbers.
2501	GP35	1963	Is the variant GP35E, rebuilt by Southern Pacific in 1978.
5399	SD9	1955	Is the variant SD9E, rebuilt by Southern Pacific in 1975.
9252	C40-8	1988	EX UP, Same Road Number.
205	2-6-2	1924	Built by the Baldwin Locomotive Works for the Santa Maria Valley Railroad
2	2-8-2	1912	Built by the Baldwin Locomotive Works for the Polson Logging Company. Sold to A&E by the Lichter family in 2022.
