= Brooklyn Yard =

Brooklyn Yard may refer to:

- Brooklyn Intermodal Rail Yard
- Brooklyn Navy Yard
