= Oregon Railroad and Navigation 197 =

Preserved 4-6-2 locomotive in Portland, Oregon

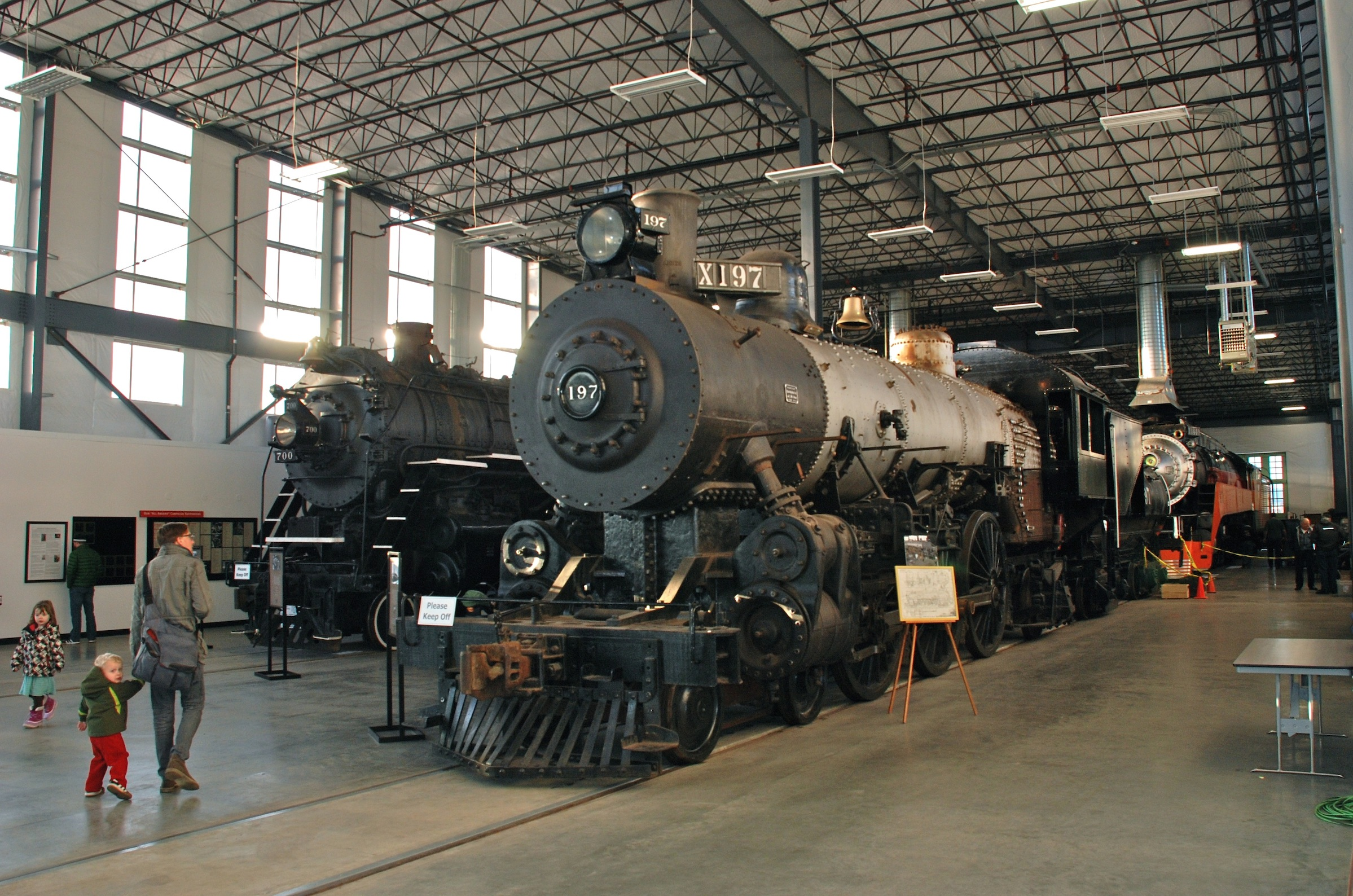
- OR&N No. 197 at the Oregon Rail Heritage Center in 2013
Type and origin
- Power type: Steam
- Builder: Baldwin Locomotive Works
- Serial number: 25717
- Build date: May 1905
- Rebuilder: Oregon Rail Heritage Center
Specifications
- Configuration
  - Whyte: 4-6-2
  - UIC: 2′C1′
- Gauge: 4 ft 8 1/2 in (1,435 mm)
- Driver dia.: 77 in (1,956 mm)
- Length: 79 ft (24.08 m)
- Adhesive weight: 142,740 lb (64.7 tonnes)
- Loco weight: 241,180 lb (109.4 tonnes)
- Fuel type: Oil
- Fuel capacity: 2,940 US gal (11,100 L; 2,450 imp gal)
- Water cap.: 9,000 US gal (34,000 L; 7,500 imp gal)
- Boiler pressure: 200 lbf/in^{2} (1.38 MPa)
- Cylinder size: Originally: 17 in × 28 in (432 mm × 711 mm) and 28 in × 28 in (711 mm × 711 mm); As rebuilt: 22 in × 28 in (559 mm × 711 mm) from 1923
- Valve gear: Stephenson
- Valve type: Piston valves
- Loco brake: Air
- Train brakes: Air
- Couplers: Knuckle
Performance figures
- Tractive effort: 29,920 lbf (133,100 N)
- Factor of adh.: 4.77
Career
- Operators: Oregon Railroad & Navigation Co.; Oregon-Washington Railroad & Navigation Co.; Union Pacific Railroad; Oregon Rail Heritage Center
- Class: P-2
- Number in class: 4
- Numbers: OR&N 197; UP 3203
- Retired: January 1958
- Preserved: 1958
- Current owner: The City of Portland, Oregon
- Disposition: Undergoing restoration to operating condition

Oregon Railroad and Navigation 197 is a 4-6-2 "Pacific" type steam locomotive, built by the Baldwin Locomotive Works (BLW) in 1905 for the Oregon Railroad and Navigation Company (OR&N). Since the OR&N was controlled by E.H. Harriman at the time, this locomotive bears a strong resemblance to Southern Pacific locomotives of the same era, since the Southern Pacific was another E.H. Harriman controlled railroad. It has been owned by the City of Portland since 1958, and since mid-2012 it resides at the Oregon Rail Heritage Center where it can be viewed by the public.

== History ==
=== Revenue service ===
OR&N No. 197 was built in May 1905 for pulling passenger trains on E.H. Harriman's Oregon Railroad and Navigation Company, a later subsidiary to the Union Pacific Railroad, in Oregon. The locomotive was first built as a Balanced Compound along with her four other classmates, those being No. 194, No. 195, and No. 196. No. 197 arrived from the builders just in time to celebrate the 1905 Lewis and Clark Centennial Exposition.

It continued to serve for Portland, Oregon, when in 1923, it and its classmates were given heavy modifications (to P-2 class) by Union Pacific Railroad at its Albina Yard in Portland, that included a new Vanderbilt-type tender. The No. 197 was originally built as a four-cylinder compound (double expansion of the steam) locomotive with Stephenson valve gear, having the high-pressure cylinders located between the frames. These high-pressure cylinders drove the second driving axle which was of a crank design, similar to an automotive crankshaft. The low-pressure cylinders received exhaust steam from the high-pressure cylinders and were located outside of the frames. These drove the second axle more conventionally, with external main rods driving crank pins on the driving wheels. The 1923 rebuilding converted it to simple (single expansion) two-cylinder operation. The valve gear was also converted from Stephenson to Walschaert, which was becoming common on modern locomotives. All four members were renumbered Union Pacific 3200-3203, with No. 197 becoming No. 3203; at that time, the OR&N had been previously merged (in 1910) into by Oregon-Washington Railroad & Navigation Company, a subsidiary of Union Pacific.

The Union Pacific used the locomotive until its retirement in January 1958, when UP donated the locomotive to the City of Portland. It was placed on display near Oaks Amusement Park on land the city purchased for a future transportation museum, then named "Oaks Pioneer Park", where it was soon joined by the larger and more powerful 4-8-4 "Northern" type locomotives Southern Pacific 4449 and Spokane, Portland and Seattle 700 and other historic railroad and interurban equipment.

=== First retirement ===
In December 1974, the SP 4449 was pulled out of Oaks Pioneer Park to be restored to pull the American Freedom Train, which would travel across the country during the United States Bicentennial. In 1987, SP&S 700 left the park to begin a restoration of its own, leaving the No. 197 the last engine in the park. The locomotive can be briefly seen in the 1993 movie Free Willy, while it was on display near Oaks Amusement Park at Oaks Pioneer Park. Due to a parking lot expansion, the No. 197 was moved a short distance from its original 1950s resting place at Oaks Pioneer Park. Otherwise, it sat almost forgotten until late 1995, when a small group of individuals banded together to consider returning the locomotive to operation.

=== Restoration ===
It took several months of negotiations and several more months of mechanical work to prepare the engine for movement, but by early February 1996 the No. 197 was almost ready to move for the first time in nearly 40 years. On February 10, 1996, it was finally removed from Oaks Pioneer Park (now called Oaks Bottom Wildlife Refuge). It was then moved to the Southern Pacific (now Union Pacific) Brooklyn Roundhouse, where it once again joined SP 4449 and SP&S 700 to begin restoration. That day just happened to coincide with the height of severe flooding in the Portland area after a series of winter storms. The Willamette River was lapping at the embankment where the engine sat. The East Portland Traction Co. (now Oregon Pacific Railroad), owner of the nearby railroad right-of-way, had to clear several mudslides the preceding day, but the engine was moved without incident.

By 2008, the restoration was about half complete and was expected to be completed as volunteers and funds were available. It is being carried out by the non-profit all-volunteer "Friends of the OR&N 197".

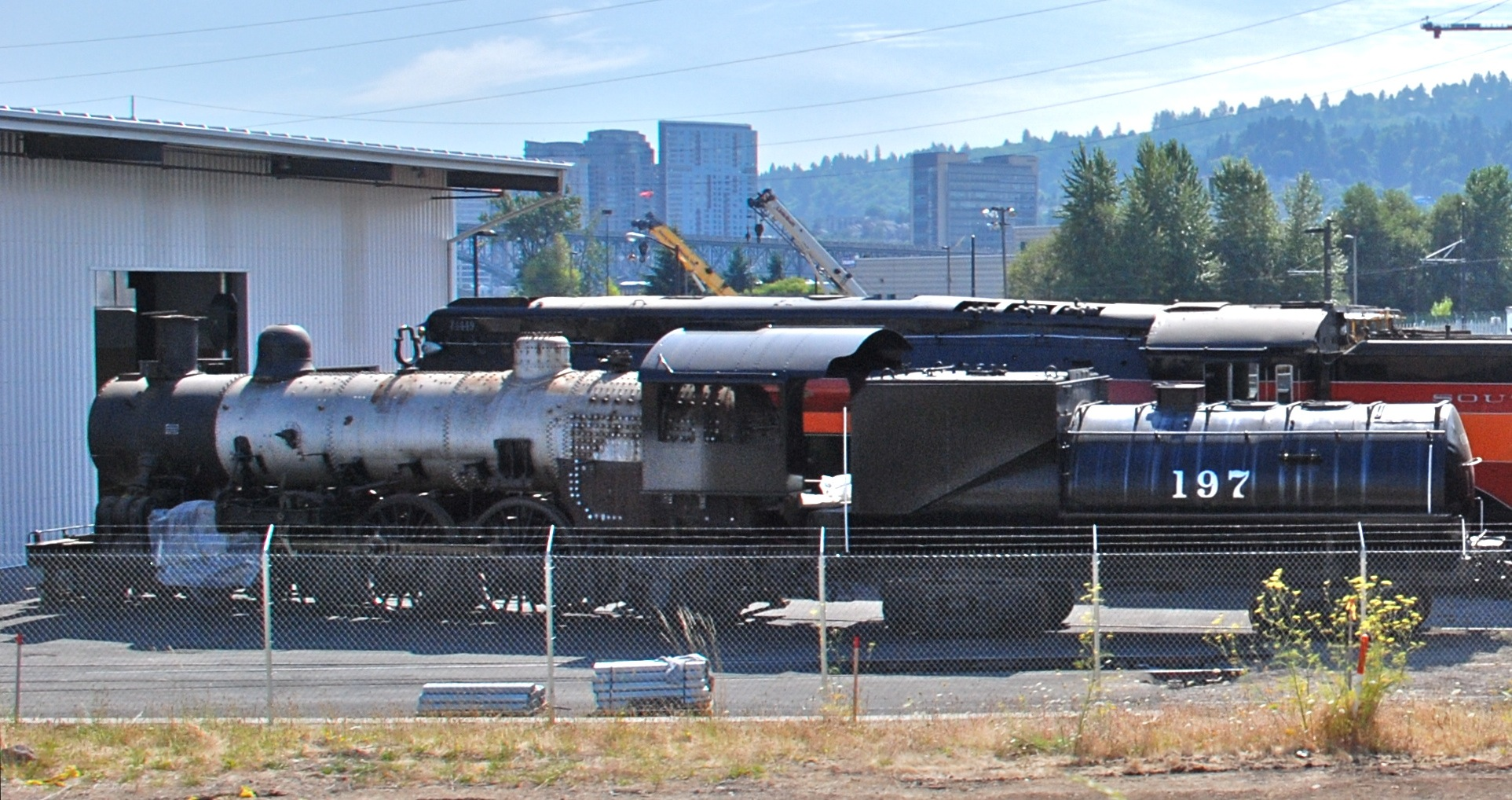
Side view of OR&N 197 outside the Oregon Rail Heritage Center before construction of the center was completed

Until 2012, OR&N 197 and Portland's other two steam locomotives were stored in the last remaining roundhouse in Portland, which was located in an active Union Pacific freight yard, the Brooklyn yard. After UP announced plans to close the Brooklyn Roundhouse, in order to expand the freight yard to facilitate increasing intermodal traffic, the non-profit Oregon Rail Heritage Foundation was formed to develop plans, and raise funds, to build a permanent home and restoration facility for Portland's three steam locomotives. Construction of the Oregon Rail Heritage Center (ORHC) began in October 2011. On June 26, 2012, Brooklyn Roundhouse ceased operations with three steam locomotives moving to the new site, and in early September the roundhouse building was torn down and the turntable was removed. The ORHC opened to the public on September 22, 2012.

In May 2023, it was announced that the ongoing restoration of No. 197 got a major boost, in that a former Union Pacific executive would help raise the $1 million needed to get No. 197 back under steam. Over the last few years, a number of significant projects have been completed, including the rebuilding of the locomotive's air pump and fabrication of an all-new cab. The Friends of the OR&N 197 organization said the boiler and the running gear will be the two biggest projects for the team. The restoration will be completed with a combination of paid staff and volunteers.
