= Union Pacific class P-2 =

Class of 4 American 4-6-2 locomotives

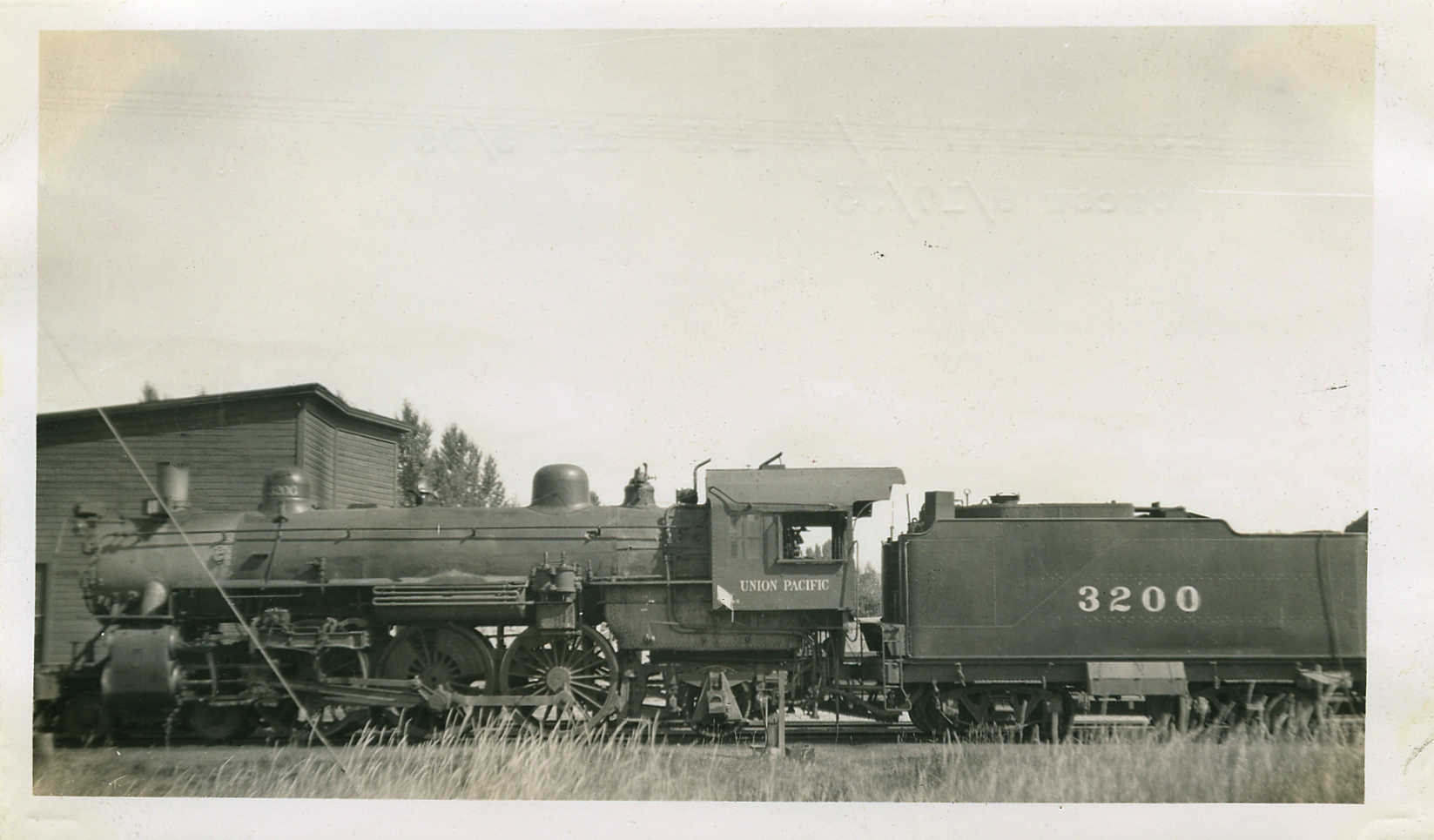
- Union Pacific P-2 No. 3200 at Moscow, Idaho on September 17, 1935.
Type and origin
- Power type: Steam
- Builder: Baldwin Locomotive Works
- Serial number: 25687-25689, 25717
- Build date: 1905
- Total produced: 4
Specifications
- Configuration
  - Whyte: 4-6-2
  - UIC: 2′C1′
- Gauge: 4 ft 8 1/2 in (1,435 mm)
- Driver dia.: 77 in (1,956 mm)
- Length: 79 ft (24.08 m)
- Adhesive weight: 142,740 lb (64.7 tonnes)
- Loco weight: 241,180 lb (109.4 tonnes)
- Fuel type: Oil
- Fuel capacity: 2,940 US gal (11,100 L; 2,450 imp gal)
- Water cap.: 9,000 US gal (34,000 L; 7,500 imp gal)
- Boiler pressure: 200 lbf/in^{2} (1.38 MPa)
- Cylinder size: Originally: 17 in × 28 in (432 mm × 711 mm) and 28 in × 28 in (711 mm × 711 mm), As rebuilt: 22 in × 28 in (559 mm × 711 mm) from 1923
- Valve gear: Stephenson
Performance figures
- Tractive effort: 29,920 lbf (133,100 N)
- Factor of adh.: 4.77
Career
- Operators: Oregon Railroad & Navigation Co., Oregon-Washington Railroad & Navigation Co., Union Pacific Railroad
- Class: UP: P-2
- Numbers: OR&N: 194–197; UP: 3200–3203
- Disposition: One preserved, remainder scrapped

The Union Pacific class P-2 was a class of 4-6-2 "Pacific" type steam locomotives that were built by the Baldwin Locomotive Works originally for the Oregon Railroad and Navigation Company (OR&N) in 1905.

== History ==
In 1905, the Oregon Railroad and Navigation Company (OR&N) purchased four locomotives from the Baldwin Locomotive Works as there was a large amount of passenger traffic caused by the Portland Fair of 1905.

== Preservation ==
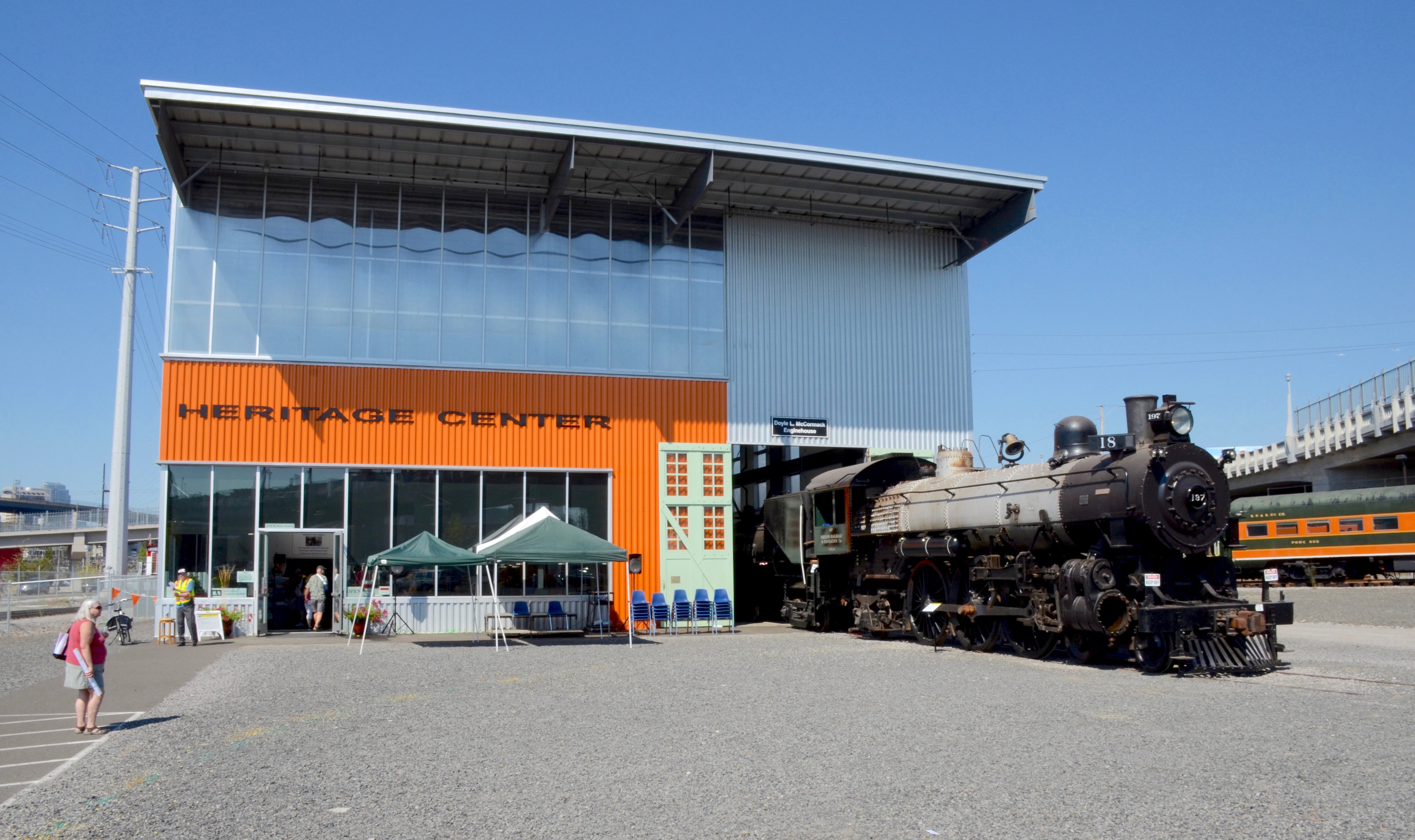
Oregon Railroad and Navigation 197 at the Oregon Rail Heritage Center (ORHC) on September 12, 2015

OR&N 197 was retired in 1958 and was donated to the City of Portland. Where it was placed on display near Oaks Amusement Park on land the city purchased for a future transportation museum, then named "Oaks Pioneer Park", where it was soon joined by two examples of the larger and more powerful 4-8-4 "Northern" type locomotives, Southern Pacific 4449 and Spokane, Portland and Seattle 700 as well as some other historic railroad and interurban equipment.

It had sat almost forgotten by the public until late 1995, when a small group of individuals banded together to consider restoring the locomotive back to operational condition.

By 2008, the restoration was about half complete and was expected to be completed as volunteers and funds are available. It was being carried out by the non-profit all-volunteer group called the Friends of the OR&N 197.

As of 2025, OR&N 197 is still in the Oregon Rail Heritage Center (ORHC), being restored to operating condition by volunteers.

== Gallery ==
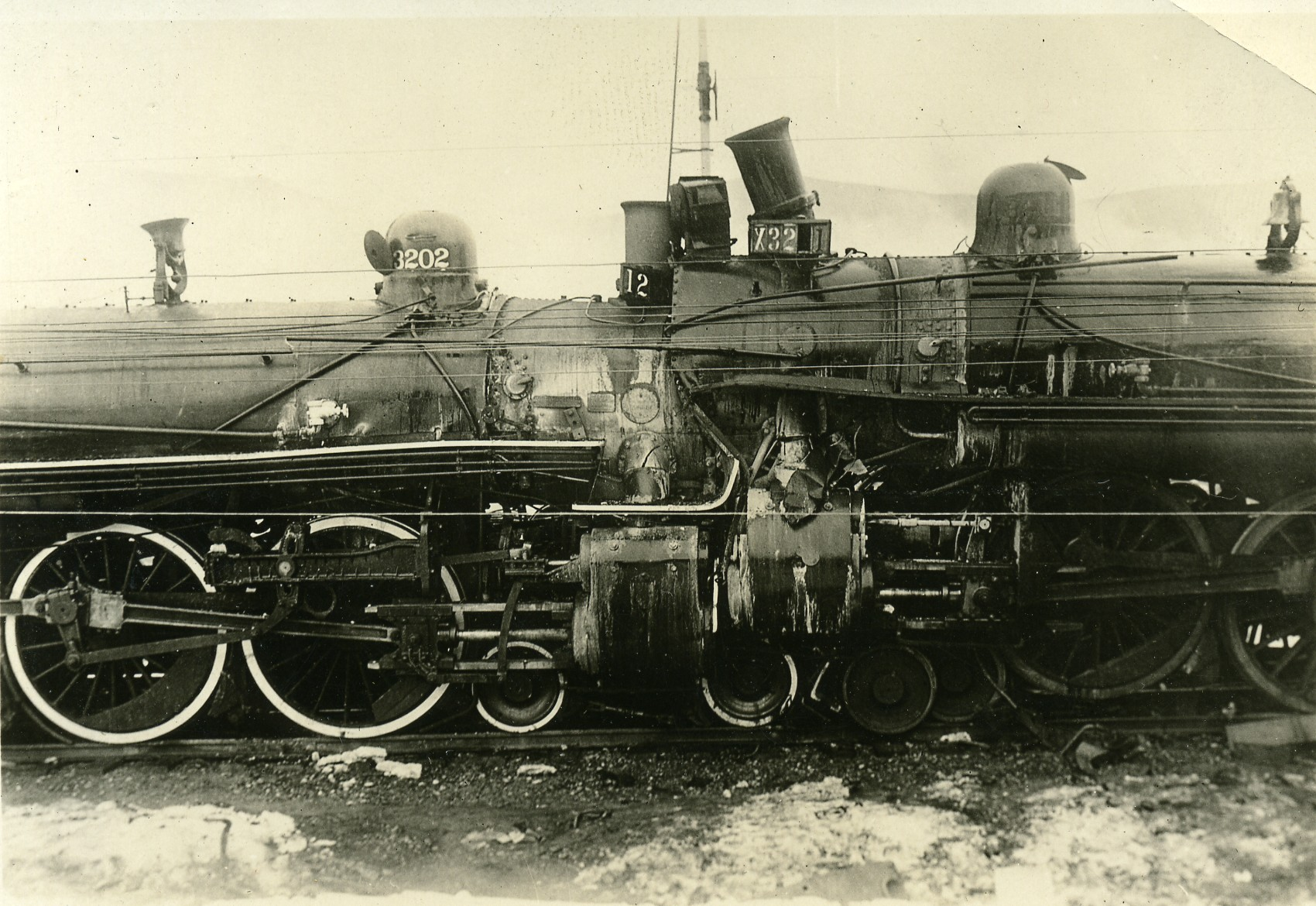
UP P-2 No. 3202 involved in a head-on collision with another steam locomotive.
