= Oregon Rail Heritage Foundation =

American non-profit organization

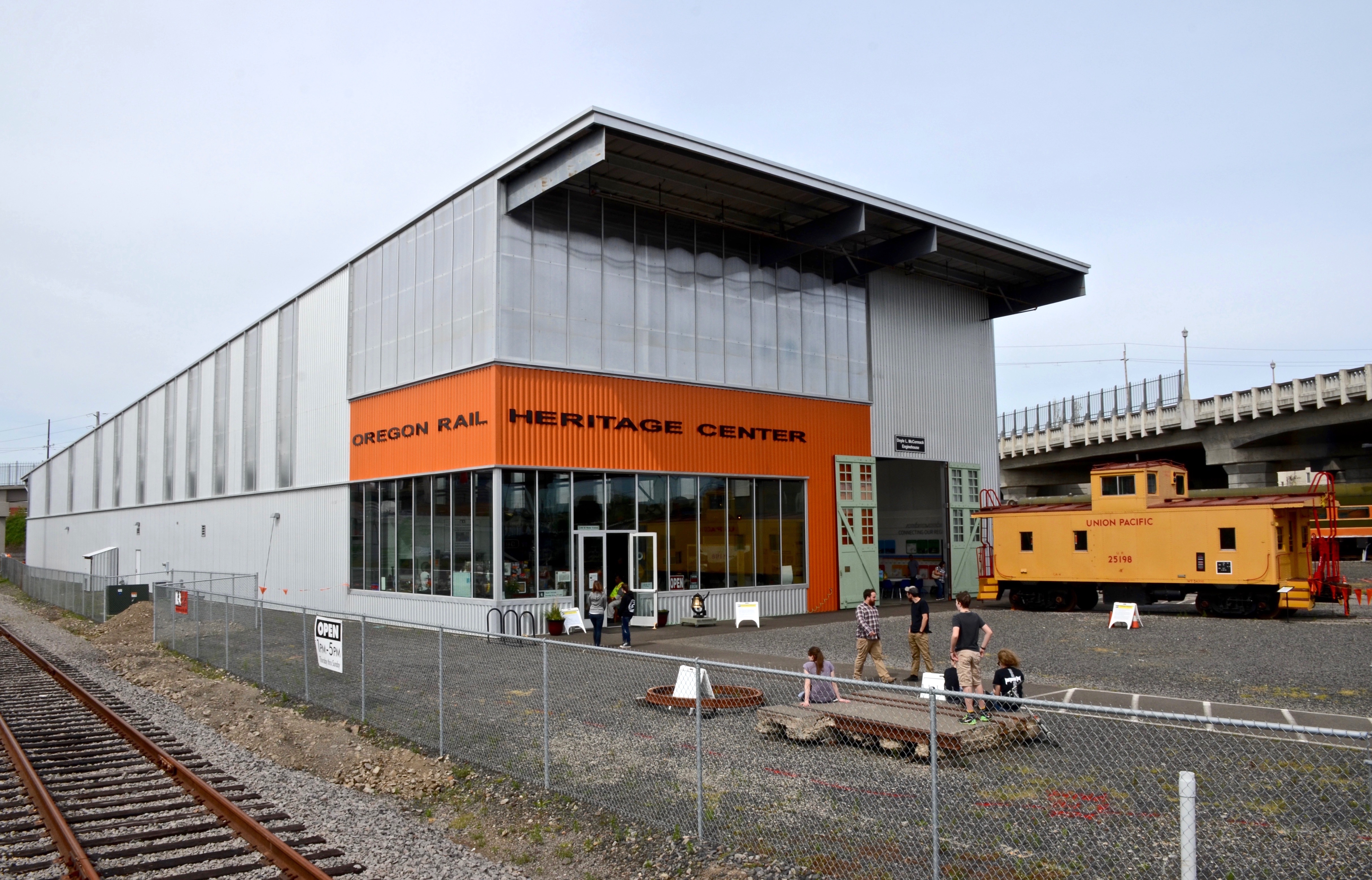
The Oregon Rail Heritage Center, the primary location of the ORHF

The Oregon Rail Heritage Foundation (ORHF) is a registered non-profit organization based in Portland, Oregon, United States. Composed of a partnership of several all-volunteer non-profit groups dedicated to maintaining regional vintage railroad equipment, the ORHF was initially formed "to secure a permanent home for the City of Portland's steam locomotives, preserve the Brooklyn Roundhouse, and establish a Rail and Industrial Heritage Museum.”

At present, the ORHF has constructed a new restoration shop for housing permanently the city's steam locomotives. Now that the Oregon Rail Heritage Center is completed (phase 1), this will permit the ORHF to continue operating steam-powered excursions while openly displaying the locomotives to the public. Access to the locomotives was previously limited as the equipment was stored on the private property of the Union Pacific Railroad, out of visitors' reach. The ORHF was tasked with completing the construction of the engine house and moving the locomotives before UP razed its current roundhouse in mid-2012.

== Equipment ==
The ORHF oversees the preservation of three city-owned steam locomotives: Southern Pacific 4449 (SP 4449), Spokane, Portland & Seattle 700 (SP&S 700), and Oregon Railroad & Navigation 197 (OR&N 197). All three engines were donated to the city in 1958 and displayed near Oaks Park at the City's "Oaks Pioneer Park" (known as Oaks Bottom Wildlife Refuge since 1988) in Southeast Portland until restored to operation (the 197's restoration is a work in progress). Each engine has its own non-profit organization and cadre of volunteers dedicated to its upkeep. They also give Portland the distinction of being the only city in the United States to own operating mainline steam locomotives. After the Oregon Pacific Railroad in 2022 restricted both No. 4449 and No. 700, due to their size and weight, from running to Oaks Park along the Springwater Corridor, the ORHF compensated by applying to obtain ownership of Mount Emily Lumber Company Shay No. 1 from the Oregon Historical Society. The Foundation succeeded, but No. 1 requires the certified FRA 1472-day maintenance in order to run again. This locomotive was moved to the site in Feb. 2024.

In addition to these engines, several vintage passenger cars, formerly owned and operated by the Great Northern Railway and the Southern Pacific Railroad and others, are owned and maintained by Pacific Railroad Preservation Association, The Friends of SP 4449, and the Pacific Northwest Chapter of the National Railway Historical Society.

The steam locomotives and other equipment was stored in the Brooklyn Roundhouse (located in the Brooklyn neighborhood of Southeast Portland), in the middle of a former Southern Pacific yard now owned by Union Pacific. The roundhouse was in the midst of a needed expansion by UP on its intermodal facilities, necessitating the movement of the locomotives to a permanent location and the eventual demolition of the roundhouse. UP had stipulated that the roundhouse must be vacated by the end of June 2012, underscoring the ORHF's determination to build a new facility by that date.

== Operations ==
=== Special excursions ===
The partner groups of ORHF are constantly working to organize an excursion train or special appearance by one of the steam locomotives, usually originating in Portland and running distances of up to 2,000 or more miles over the course of several days, weeks, or even months. Excursions are often planned months or years in advance in accordance with the destination, and dependent upon the approval of the host railroad(s). An excursion may be as brief as never leaving the Portland city limits, or as long as the SP 4449's journey to Owosso, Michigan for TrainFestival 2009, hosted by the Steam Railroading Institute.

The SP 4449 had also frequently appeared at the classic automobile show "Cruisin' Sherwood" in Sherwood Old Town, Ore., while the SP&S 700 had often participated in the annual Burlington Northern Santa Fe Railway (BNSF) holiday celebration in Vancouver, Washington. Both engines teamed up in July 2005 to doublehead the National Railway Historical Society "Western Star" from Portland to Wishram, Washington. Each engine has also taken a turn on "Montana by Steam", a round trip between Portland and Billings, Montana, during the past couple decades. The 700 pulled a number of short excursions on the Oregon Pacific Railroad (OPR) in 2006 and 2007, along with appearances at the Salem Safety Faire in Salem, Oregon. In the summer of 2011, the SP 4449 hauled two excursions: one to Tacoma and Stampede Pass for the NRHS annual convention, and another up the Columbia River Gorge to Wishram to celebrate its 70th anniversary and help to raise funds for an upcoming 15-year boiler certification.

=== Holiday Express ===
One of ORHF's largest annual events, since 2005, is the operation of the Holiday Express excursion trains, previously pulled by locomotives 4449 and/or 700 on weekends in December between the Oregon Rail Heritage Center and Oaks Amusement Park along the Springwater Corridor. The Holiday Express has carried as many as 10,000 passengers each year. The trains run along the Oregon Pacific Railroad East Portland Division, main line along the Springwater Corridor near the east bank of the Willamette River, while children on board are greeted by Santa Claus and company.

The Holiday Express has been a major source of fundraising for ORHF, helping to raise the resources needed for the museum's construction and ongoing operation. In 2011, the Holiday Express operated on the first two weekends of December, raising almost $75,000. However, as of 2022, the heavy weight and rigid wheelbases of both No. 700 and No. 4449 caused damage to the Oregon Pacific Railroad's trackage. Starting in 2022, a different, smaller and lighter-weight logging steam locomotive was used instead—Polson Logging Co. 2 on temporary loan to ORHF.

== Partner Groups ==
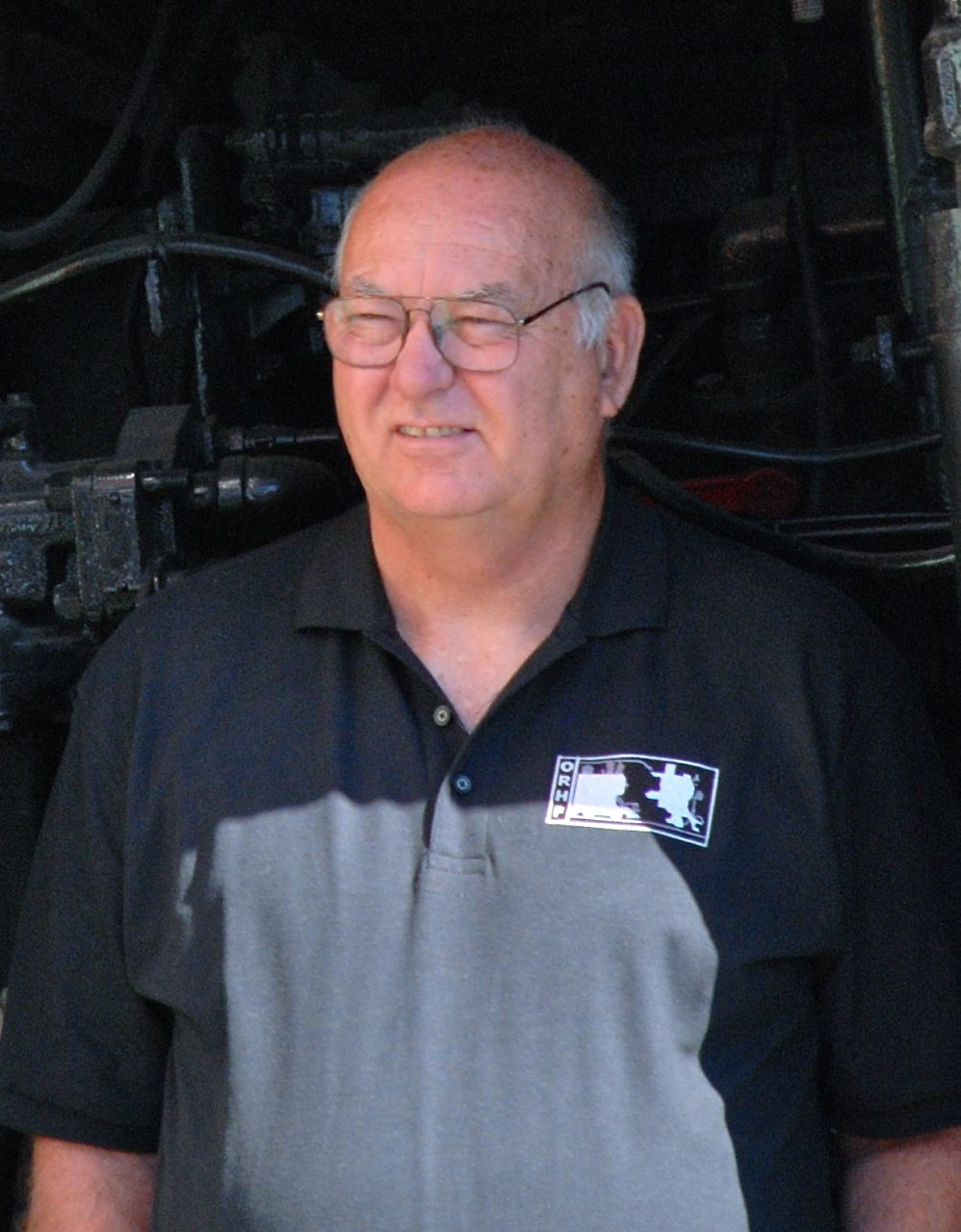
ORHF past-president Doyle McCormack

The ORHF consists of the following Partner Groups:

  - Friends of SP 4449 Inc.
  - Friends of OR&N 197
  - Pacific Railroad Preservation Association (dedicated to SP&S 700)
  - Northwest Rail Museum
  - Pacific Northwest Chapter of the National Railway Historical Society
  - City of Portland Parks & Recreation

Retired SP/UP locomotive engineer Doyle McCormack served as the ORHF's president until the end of 2018; he has been the engineer and chief mechanical officer of the SP 4449 since its restoration in 1975. Former State of Oregon rail planner Ed Immel, who founded the Northwest Rail Museum in 1986, previously served as vice-president. The volunteer members of the restoration groups spend several hundred hours each week doing mechanical or cosmetic work on the locomotives and rolling stock. The estimated value and quantity of volunteer labor comes to $2.5 million over 115,000 hours since 1975, and it has been often stated that every hour of operation is the result of 100 volunteer hours of work.

About 150 people volunteer for the ORHF itself every year, mainly with the annual Holiday Express, other celebrations (such as National Train Day), and infrequent mainline excursion trains. While the ORHF on its own has no active part in equipment maintenance for equipment it does not own (relying on the partner groups), it serves as a single point of contact with the City of Portland regarding the three city-owned steam locomotives and their associated non-profit organizations.

Other partners supportive of ORHF's mission are Union Pacific and its Foundation, the Oregon Pacific Railroad, the Portland & Western Railroad, the Oregon Museum of Science and Industry, the Oregon Cultural Trust, the City of Portland, TriMet, M.J. Murdock Charitable Trust, Collins Foundation, BNSF Foundation, Candelaria Fund, Fred Meyer Corporation, Swindells Charitable Trust, Lamb Baldwin Foundation, and individual donors who have contributed over $1.23 million through 2012.

== History ==
The ORHF was initially formed in 1998 as the "Roundhouse Task Force" following UP's desire to expand its recently acquired Portland intermodal facilities, putting the future of the Brooklyn Roundhouse and its tenants at stake. Faced with the grim possibility of the locomotives being returned to non-operational outdoor display exposed to weather and vandalism, the foundation set about searching for a new piece of property upon which to construct a new engine house and visitors' center. The non-profit Oregon Steam Heritage Foundation was granted 501(c)3 status in 2000, which was later renamed the ORHF in 2002, and began actively raising awareness of its mission at various public events, in addition to operating a number of excursions with the SP 4449 and SP&S 700.

2003 saw many meetings and dialogues with parties concerned, including Portland city planners, community leaders, UP, and the Oregon Museum of Science and Industry (OMSI). Also in 2003, the ORHF partnered with Portland development firm Shiels-Obletz-Johnsen to examine the desired properties and develop a master plan for construction. The ORHF began work on its business plan, including an inventory of all equipment at the Brooklyn Roundhouse, in 2004. 2005 was the first year for the annual Holiday Express trains, operated over the OPR main line between Oaks Park and OMSI on December weekends; it was an immediate success with 5,200 passengers.

When the locomotives started moving to the Brooklyn Roundhouse for restoration in 1984, Southern Pacific Railroad owned the yard. SP made an agreement with the City of Portland to allow the locomotives to reside there in the vacant roundhouse. Stipulations included that the City of Portland would pay $1.00 per year for the lease, and the railroad could issue a 30-day notice to vacate the property. The agreement's terms transferred to the Union Pacific Railroad when it purchased the SP in 1996. However, the ongoing nationwide rise in intermodal transportation obliged UP to redevelop that area in more recent years. It became inevitable that the Brooklyn Roundhouse would have to be razed and the engines would lose their protective roof, thus the need for a newer, sturdier and more permanent structure to shelter them from the elements.

When a land prospect near Portland's Union Station fell through, the ORHF finally struck a deal a piece of property adjacent to OMSI in 2009. The foundation then was approached by the Portland public-transit agency TriMet to trade this location (Site 1) for a second, larger site (Site 2) that was available for lease. Site 2 is bordered by the Martin Luther King, Jr. Boulevard viaduct, between the main lines of UP and OPR, and in the midst of a thriving Portland cultural district. Now completed, the new Eastside Streetcar and, since September 2015, the TriMet MAX "Orange Line" Portland–Milwaukie light rail lines flank its north and south borders. The established priority was to construct the new Enginehouse and relocate the locomotives in time to meet UP's deadline, then later fill out the remainder of the site with a rail heritage interpretive center and museum, the Oregon Rail Heritage Center (ORHC).

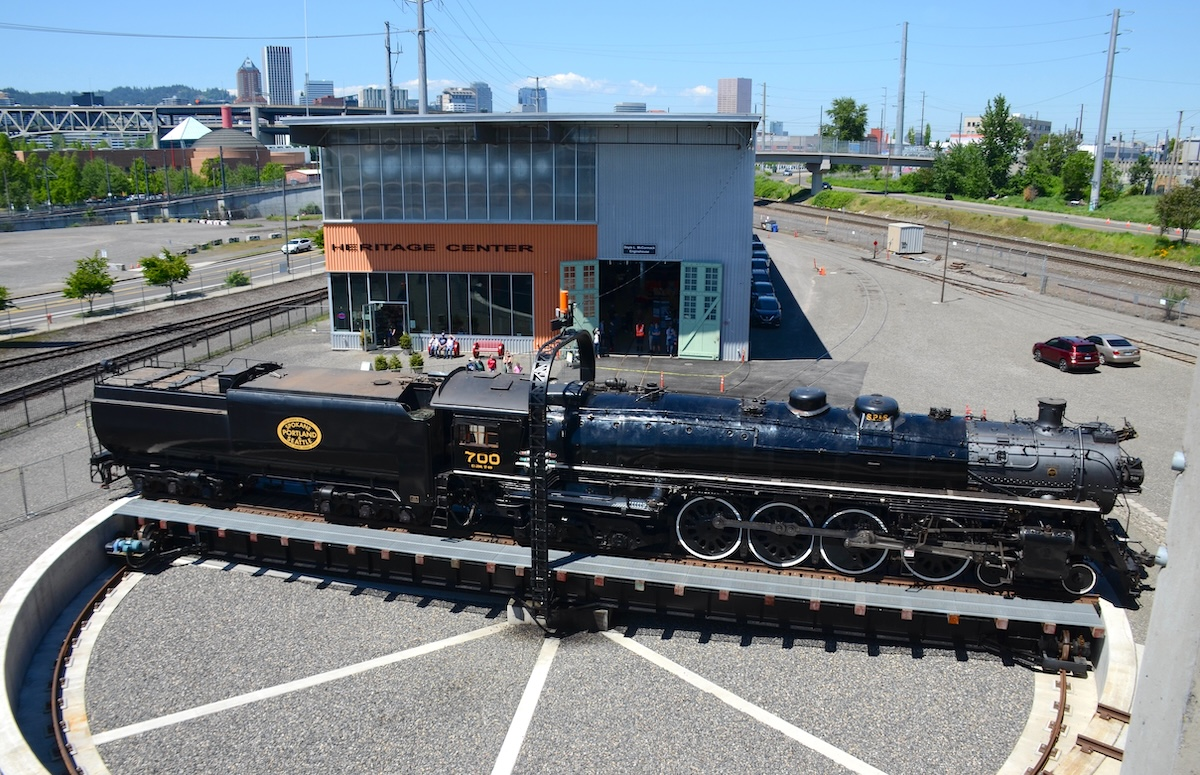
The long-planned installation of the former SP turntable at the ORHC was finally carried out in 2023. SP&S 700 is being turned in this photo.

At first it was hoped that the roundhouse could be dismantled and reassembled on the new site, but it was learned that a full preservation of the roundhouse was not possible. However, the Brooklyn turntable – useful to the locomotives' operation – was slated to be moved to the new engine house, and as of 2023 nearing completion of installation at the site. When the Portland City Council approved a loan of nearly $1 million for the development of the site on October 28, 2009, the ORHF hired the architectural services of Hennebery Eddy to design the new facilities. Portland Parks & Recreation then joined hands with the ORHF, with Lorentz Bruun Construction being hired as the engine house contractor.

On October 22, 2010, ORHF President McCormack broke ground on Site 1 across the street from OMSI, for a new track to be laid for temporary storage of the Holiday Express train consist of vintage rail passenger cars. One year later, on October 21, 2011, Parks Commissioner Nick Fish, alongside McCormack and other Portland dignitaries, held a groundbreaking ceremony on Site 2 for the engine house itself with about 200 people in attendance.

In December 2024, the OHRF announced that, by late 2026, they will acquire the Oregon Pacific Railroad East Portland Branch, the 5-mile line between Portland and Milwaukie, with the goal of enhancing excursion operations for future generations.

== Capital campaign ==
Since UP's decree to vacate the roundhouse, the ORHF has been actively seeking the support of the City of Portland, the general population, and rail enthusiasts worldwide to raise over $5 million for the new heritage center. A donation of the land from UP could not be agreed upon, prompting the ORHF to commence its "All Aboard" fundraising campaign in June 2009. Response was greatly positive, with the City of Portland providing a substantial loan and an anonymous donor giving $1 million to the campaign. Other foundations, grants, corporations and individuals have contributed thousands more.

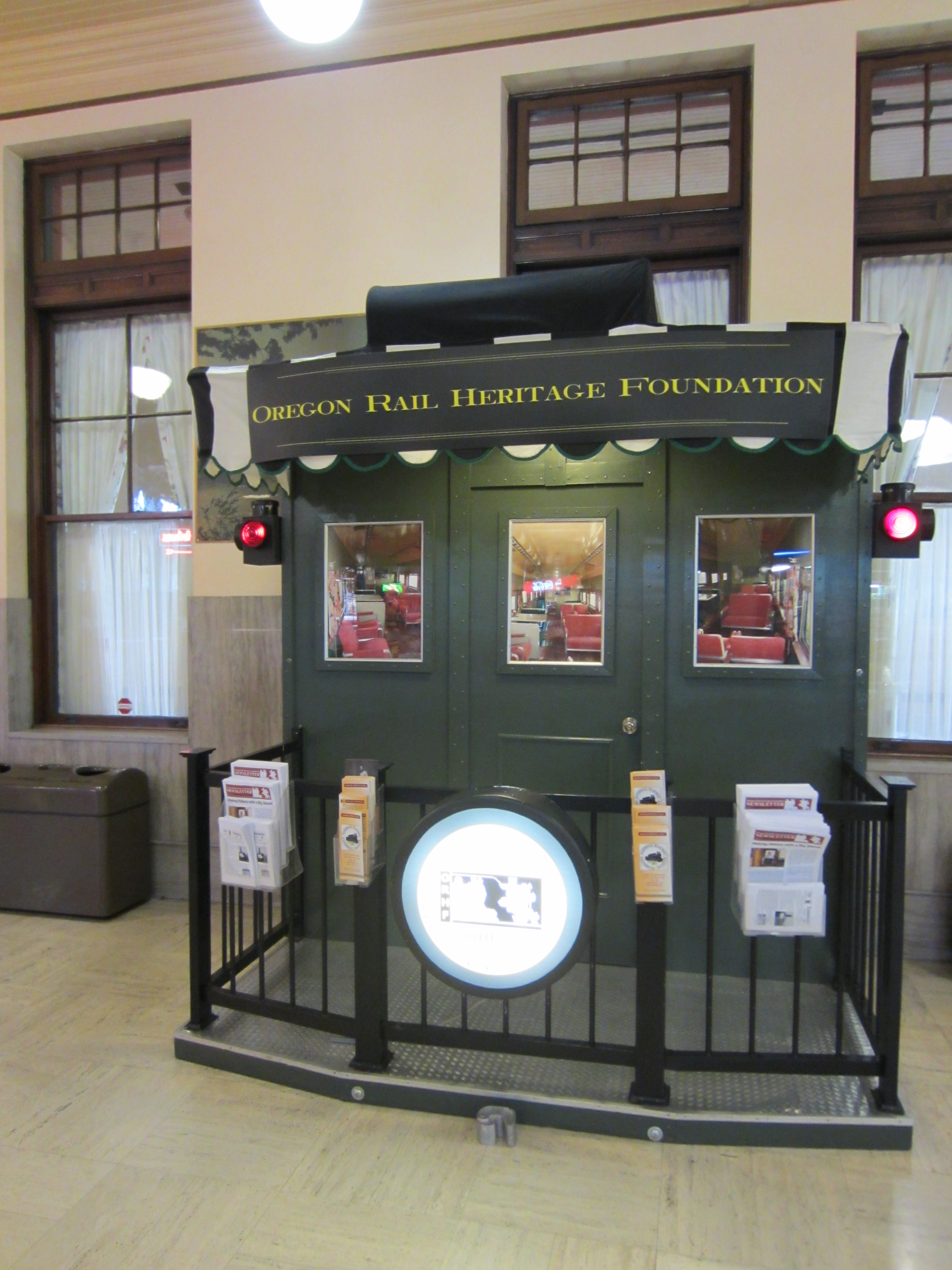
ORHF display inside Union Station in 2012

The result of the campaign was the Oregon Rail Heritage Center, which was to be completed in three phases. The first and most critical phase was the Enginehouse, to ensure that the locomotives are safely indoors before the Brooklyn Roundhouse is disposed of. The second phase was the lay out an external area at the southeast end of the engine house for the turntable to be installed, plus tracks for other equipment to be stored and maintained; connections to the UP and OPR lines was laid there as well. The ongoing third and final phase was the build-out of an interpretive center in the Enginehouse where visitors can explore the engines' past lives, along with the history of rail transportation and its part in the development of Portland.

On July 27, 2011, the Portland City Council voted unanimously to extend the repayment of its loan through 2016 and approve new leases for property and nearby parking. The loan has since been repaid.

== The Rail Heritage Center ==
In June 2012, the construction of the two-track engine house had progressed steadily with foundation work, the pouring of the concrete floor, and the erection of the frame. The partner groups moved lighter equipment out of the Brooklyn Roundhouse and prepared to move the locomotives themselves by the end of the June 2012. UP initially intended to close the roundhouse in January, but extended the deadline to June 30 to allow more time for the new facility to be completed. When construction and move-in had been completed over the summer, the grand opening of the Oregon Rail Heritage Center was in September 2012. The center has been opened to the public four days per week since September 22, 2012.

== See also ==
- History of rail in Oregon
