= Brooklyn Intermodal Rail Yard =

Rail yard in Portland, Oregon, U.S.

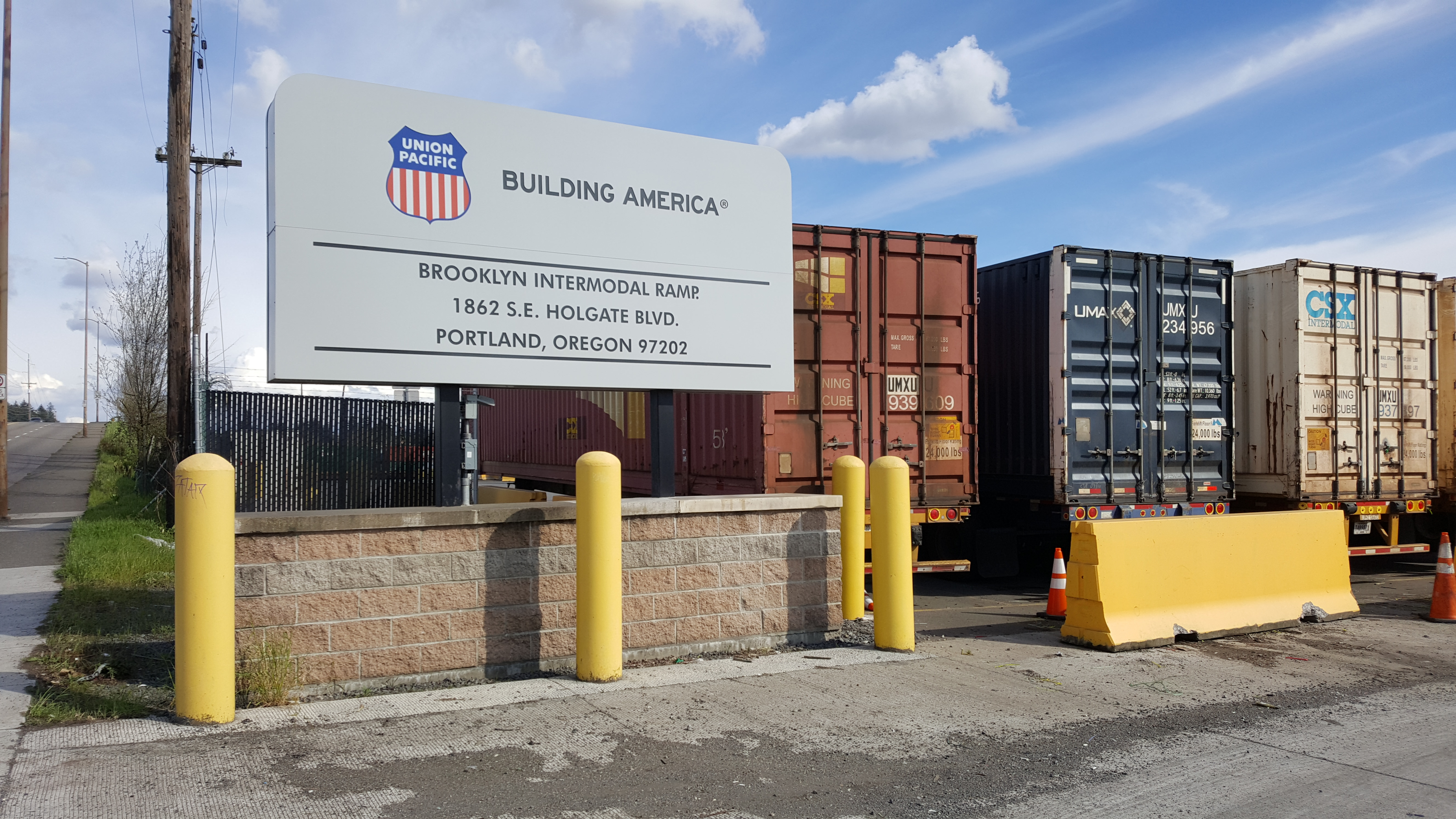
- Signage at SE Holgate entrance, 2019
- Location: Portland, Oregon, U.S.
- Location within Portland, Oregon
- Coordinates: 45.48957°N 122.64366°W

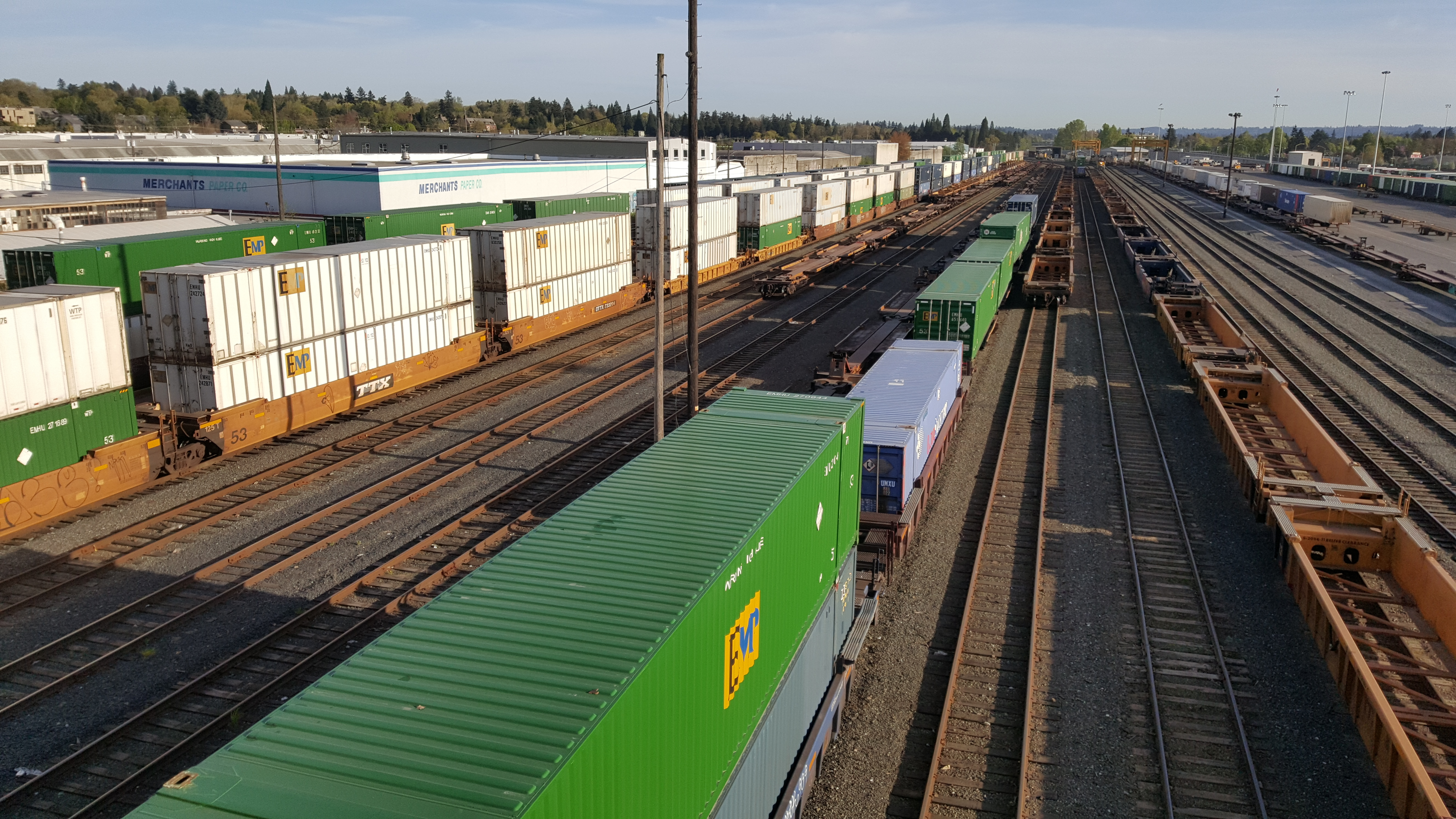
Rails from Southeast Holgate, 2016

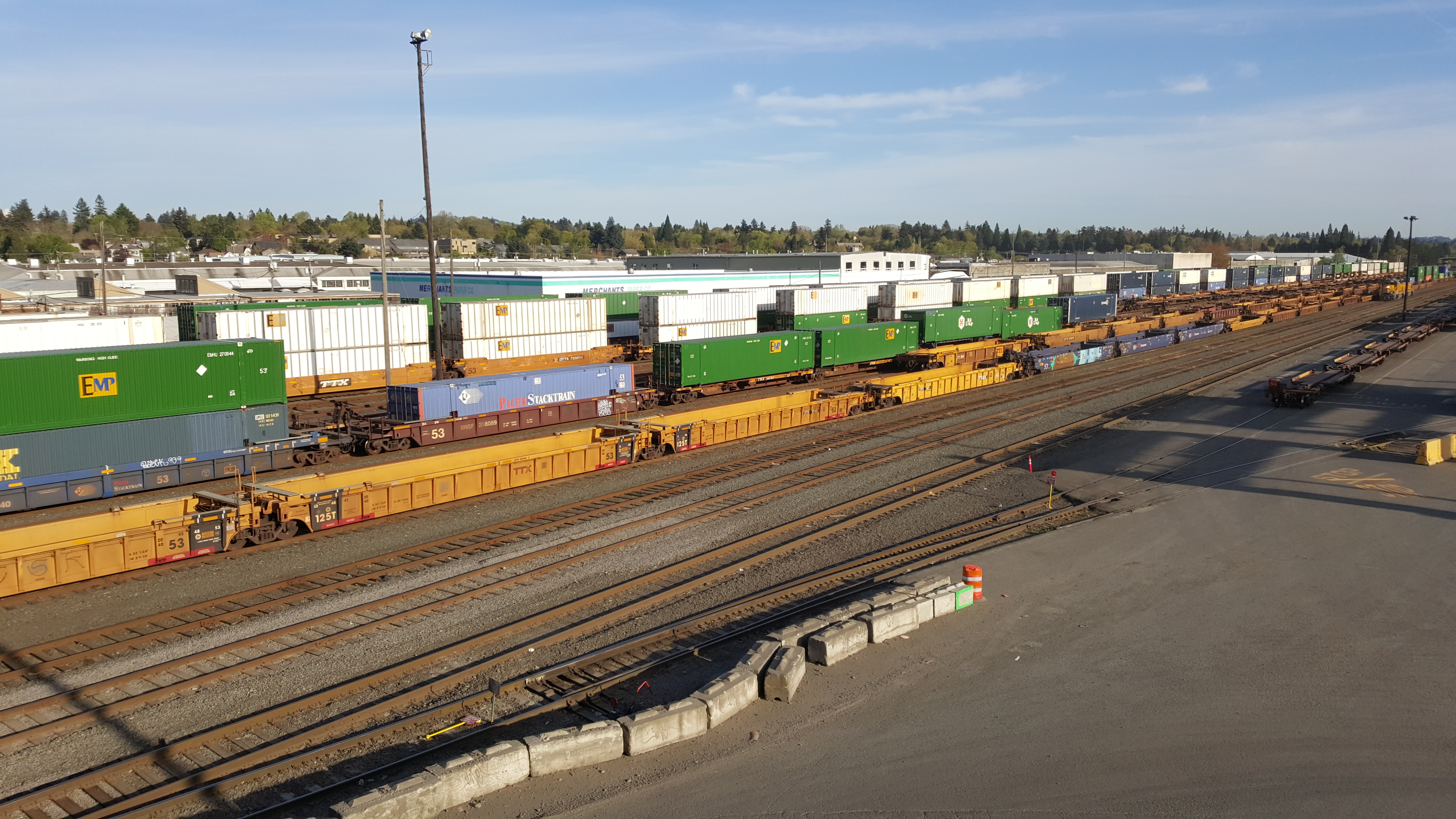
Rails, 2016

The Brooklyn Intermodal Rail Yard is a 110-acre Union Pacific rail yard in southeast Portland, Oregon, stretching from Powell Boulevard to Bybee Boulevard and operating since the 1860s.

== History ==
The Oregon and California Railroad started laying tracks here in April 1868. The Southern Pacific Transportation Company gained controlled of the railroad in 1887. The name Brooklyn Yard was adopted in 1912. This yard was the principal Southern Pacific railroad shops in Oregon. By 1910, a twelve-stall roundhouse and eight-track machine shop were developed. By 1920, the switching yard was developed south of the Holgate Street viaduct. The turntable was updated on December 11, 1924, with the installation of a 100-foot long bridge built by American Bridge Company, replacing an earlier 80-foot turntable. The larger 4-stall roundhouse was completed in 1941, and was used for larger engines. The Union Pacific Railroad took control of the Southern Pacific in 1996 and now operates the yard.

Activities of the yard have been limited by adjacent neighborhoods. The rail yard is an important part of the economy in the state and supports north-south freight movement along the West Coast, including the shipment of Oregon-made products. Every holiday season thousands and thousands of Christmas trees are shipped from Oregon out of Brooklyn Rail Yard.

A 100-foot turntable had previously been at Brooklyn Yard but was removed in 2012 when the yard was being converted to intermodal service. In October 2023, the Oregon Rail Heritage Center reinstalled the turntable from Brooklyn Yard at its facility.
