= Oregon Pacific Railroad (1997) =

American short-line railway

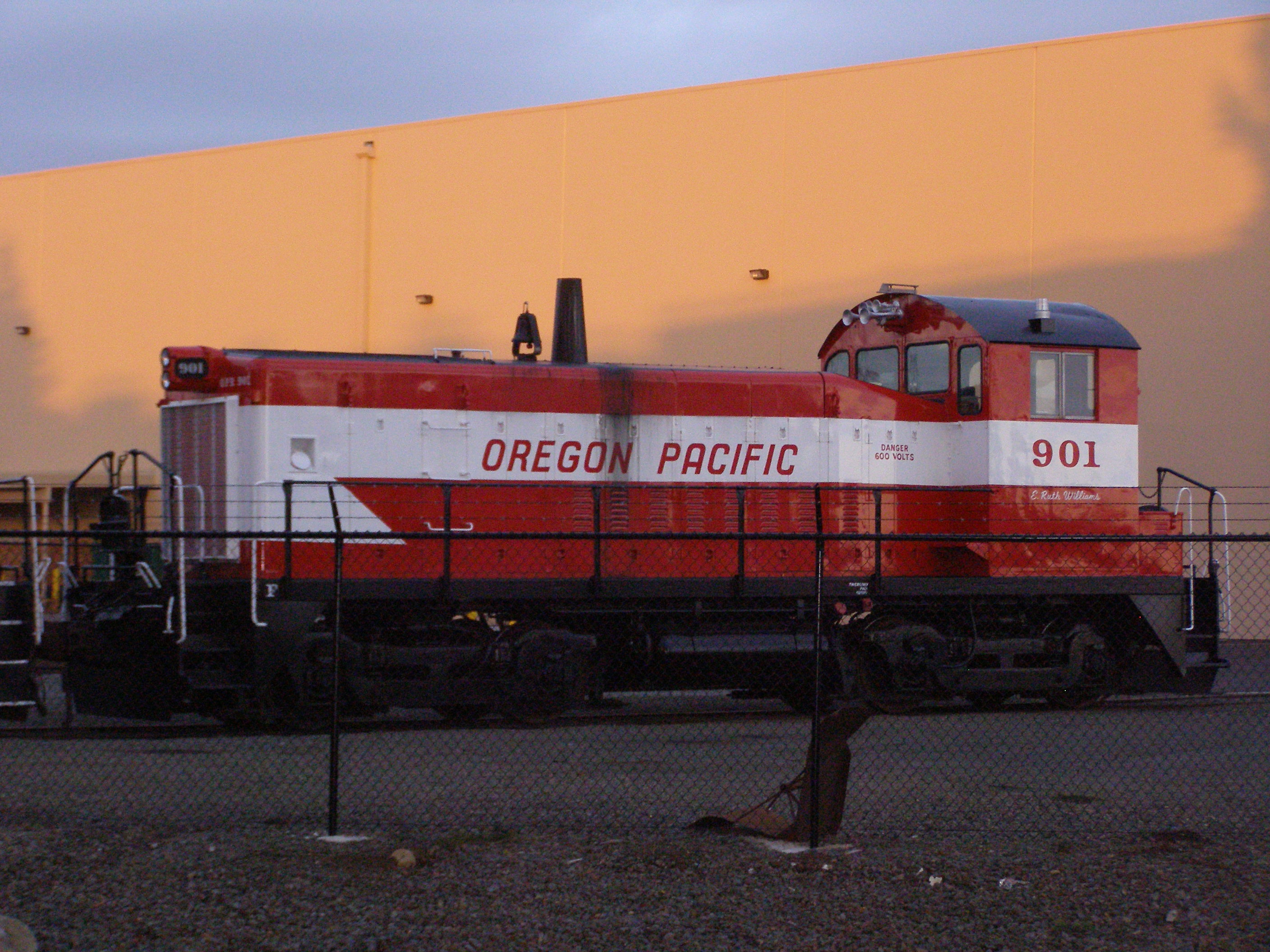
- Oregon Pacific 901, an EMD SW900, parked in the American Steel siding in Canby, Oregon

Overview
- Headquarters: Portland, Oregon
- Reporting mark: OPR
- Locale: Oregon, United States
- Dates of operation: 1991–

Technical
- Track gauge: 4 ft 8 1/2 in (1,435 mm) standard gauge

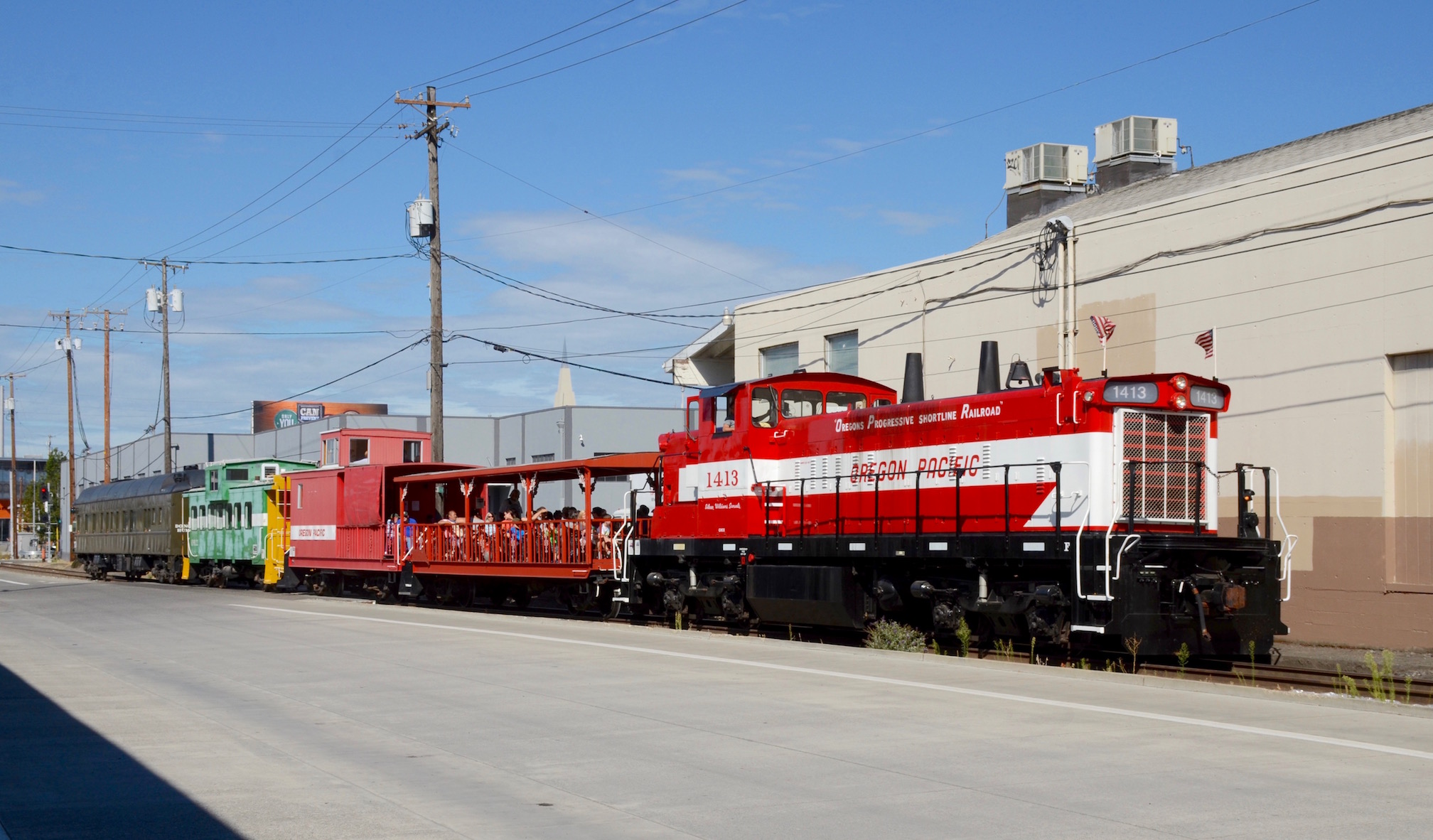
A train making one of the Saturday excursion runs on OPR tracks between the Oregon Rail Heritage Center and Oaks Amusement Park

Oregon Pacific Railroad (reporting mark OPR) is a short-line railroad operating two disconnected routes: one in southeast Portland, Oregon, and another incorporating portions of the former Southern Pacific Molalla Branch between Canby and Liberal, Oregon.

== History ==
Dick Samuels, a local businessman owning a scrap steel business, purchased the rights to salvage the remnants of the Portland Traction Company's remaining freight railroad between Portland and Boring. The Portland Terminal Railroad was once an interurban railroad but had been owned 50/50 by the Southern Pacific and Union Pacific railroads since the mid-1950s to handle the remaining freight business along the road. By the mid-1980s the remaining freight business east of Milwaukie was virtually gone as local land uses shifted from farming and industrial to housing. Some of the last shipments along the railroad were TriMet's first light rail cars, delivered to its Ruby Junction shops, which were located on a former Portland Traction Company branch line that had been abandoned years before.

Despite the loss of most business, there was still a handful of shippers that continued to reliably ship by train from an industrial park located in the northern part of Milwaukie along the Portland city boundary. Mr. Samuels purchased the approximately five miles of track from Portland to Milwaukie and formed the East Portland Traction Company to continue rail service to those customers. The customers included Americold, Darigold, and the Oregon Liquor Control Commission.

In 1993, the East Portland Traction Company began running an excursion train known as Samtrak (named after the owner as well as a play on Amtrak, the national passenger railroad company) from the Oregon Museum of Science and Industry (OMSI) to Portland's Sellwood neighborhood. The train itself was modest with a small General Electric 45-ton locomotive, an open-air coach made from an old flatcar and a converted former logging railroad caboose. Although the excursion trains stopped running in 2001, the Oregon Pacific Railroad continues to host special excursions featuring the popular Holiday Express trains using Southern Pacific 4449 and Spokane, Portland & Seattle 700 restored steam locomotives, as well as several speeder (motorcar) runs every year.

Also in 1993, the Oregon Pacific leased the Southern Pacific's Molalla Branch connecting Canby with Molalla. This approximately 10-mile (16 km) route serves several shippers within Canby as well as in the small community of Liberal. However, several miles of track from Liberal into Molalla were abandoned after the loss of all shippers in the town. This operation was originally known as the Molalla Western Railway.

In 1997, both railroads were officially merged into the Oregon Pacific Railroad with the East Portland Traction Company becoming the East Portland Division and the Molalla Western Railway becoming the Molalla Branch Division.

As of 2012, the Oregon Pacific continues to operate its two railroads to provide freight service to its shippers. It also allows organizations or private individuals to charter a train, has operated trains featured in at least one movie and several television shows, and operates the popular Christmas time Holiday Express trains.

In December 2024, it was announced the Oregon Pacific Railroad East Portland Division, the 5-mile line between Portland and Milwaukie along the Willamette River, would be acquired by October 2026 by the Oregon Rail Heritage Foundation with the goal of continuing and enhancing excursion operations.

== Roster ==
Number	Builder	Model	Built	Former	Notes
45	GE	45-ton	unknown	Unknown scrap yard	Stored out of service. One engine was removed and replaced with a hydraulic boom for lifting rails and ties from the right-of-way.
100	EMD	SW1	1952	Portland Traction Company 100	One of two locomotives purchased by the Portland Traction Company specifically for this route. Assigned to the East Portland Division. During a restoration in 2016, the trolley poles No. 100 carried until 1958 – not for power but to activate signals on the then-electrified sections of track – were reinstalled.
101	GE	80-ton	1956	Pacific Lumber Company	Scrapped in 2014.
187	EMD	NW5	1946	Great Northern/Burlington Northern	Scrapped in 2014.
500	GE	80-ton	1950s	U.S. Army	Scrapped.
501	GE	80-ton	1950s	U.S. Army	Sold to CDL Pacific Grain (Portland, OR) in 2014.
801	EMD	SW8	1951	Great Northern/Burlington Northern	Assigned to the Canby-Liberal line. Burned during the 2020 Western United States wildfire season
802/1127	EMD	SW8	1953	Southern Pacific	Currently being overhauled on the East Portland Line.
803	EMD	SW8	1953	Texas and New Orleans	Was sold to Western Rail in 2010 and purchased back in 2020. Currently inoperable and assigned to the Canby-Liberal Line.
901	EMD	SW900	1950s	Cedar Rapids & Iowa City Railway	Rebuilt from an SW8. Assigned to the Canby-Liberal Line.
1202	GMD	SW1200RS	1953	Canadian Pacific	Rebuilt from an SW9. Assigned to the Canby-Liberal Line.
1413	GMD	GMD1	1959	Canadian National	Purchased in 2010; Assigned to the East Portland Division. 2nd locomotive officially named Eileen Williams Samuels.
5100	GE	70-ton	1949	Southern Pacific	Purchased in 1989. As of 2001, the unit is out of service. Painted in "as-delivered" Southern Pacific paint scheme. As of 2020, the unit was sitting at the OPR shops in Milwaukee.

== See also ==
- Springwater Corridor Trail: a rails-to-trails conversion of the majority of Portland Traction Company's track to Boring.
