= Oregon Rail Heritage Center =

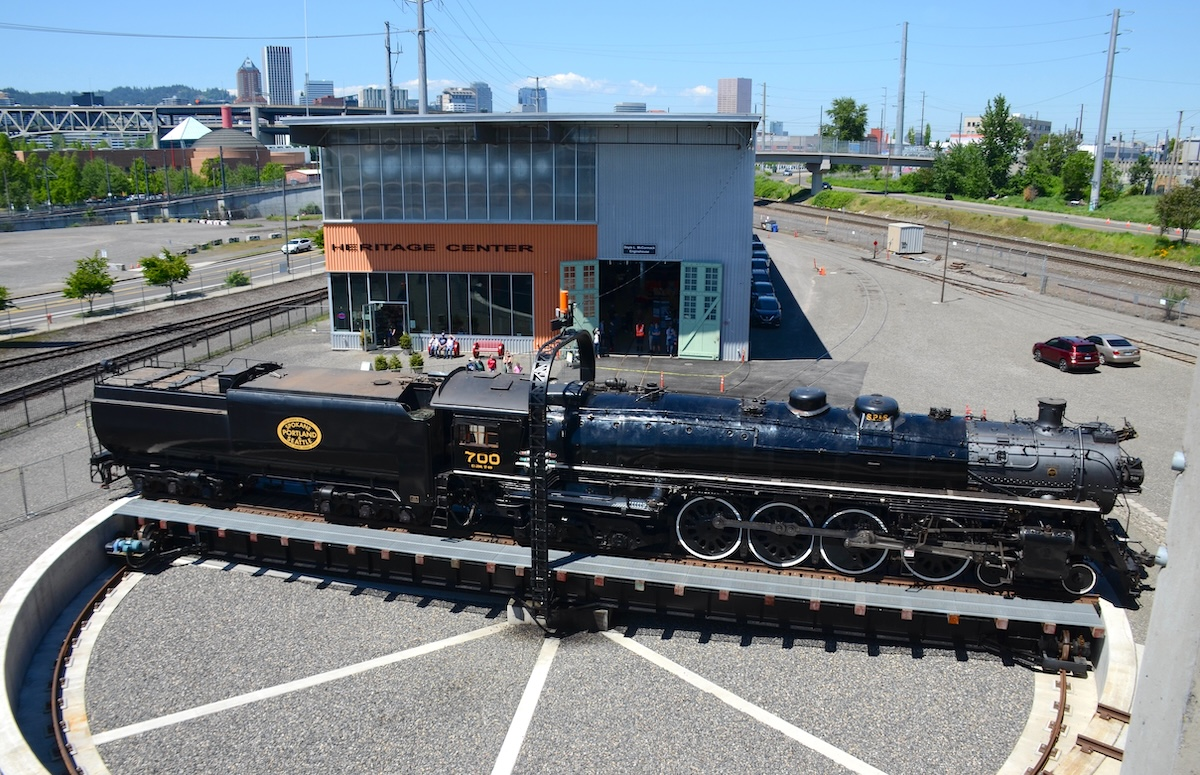
- Spokane, Portland & Seattle 700 on the turntable in 2024

- Location in Portland, across the river from downtown
- Established: 2012
- Location: Portland, Oregon, U.S.
- Coordinates: 45.507306°N 122.661722°W
- Type: Railway museum
- Owner: Oregon Rail Heritage Foundation
- Public transit access: TriMet MAX Orange Line; Portland Streetcar Loop Service; TriMet bus routes FX2, 9, 17, and 19
- Website: www.orhf.org

The Oregon Rail Heritage Center (reporting mark ORHC) is a railway museum in Portland, Oregon. Along with other rolling stock, the museum houses three steam locomotives owned by the City of Portland: Southern Pacific 4449, Spokane, Portland & Seattle 700, and Oregon Railroad & Navigation Co. 197, the first two of which are restored and operable. The center opened to the public on September 22, 2012. The project to establish the center was led by the Oregon Rail Heritage Foundation (ORHF), a non-profit organization, which was renamed from the Oregon Heritage Steam Foundation in 2002. The non-profit Oregon Steam Heritage Foundation was formed in 2000. The museum site is in Southeast Portland.

== Background ==
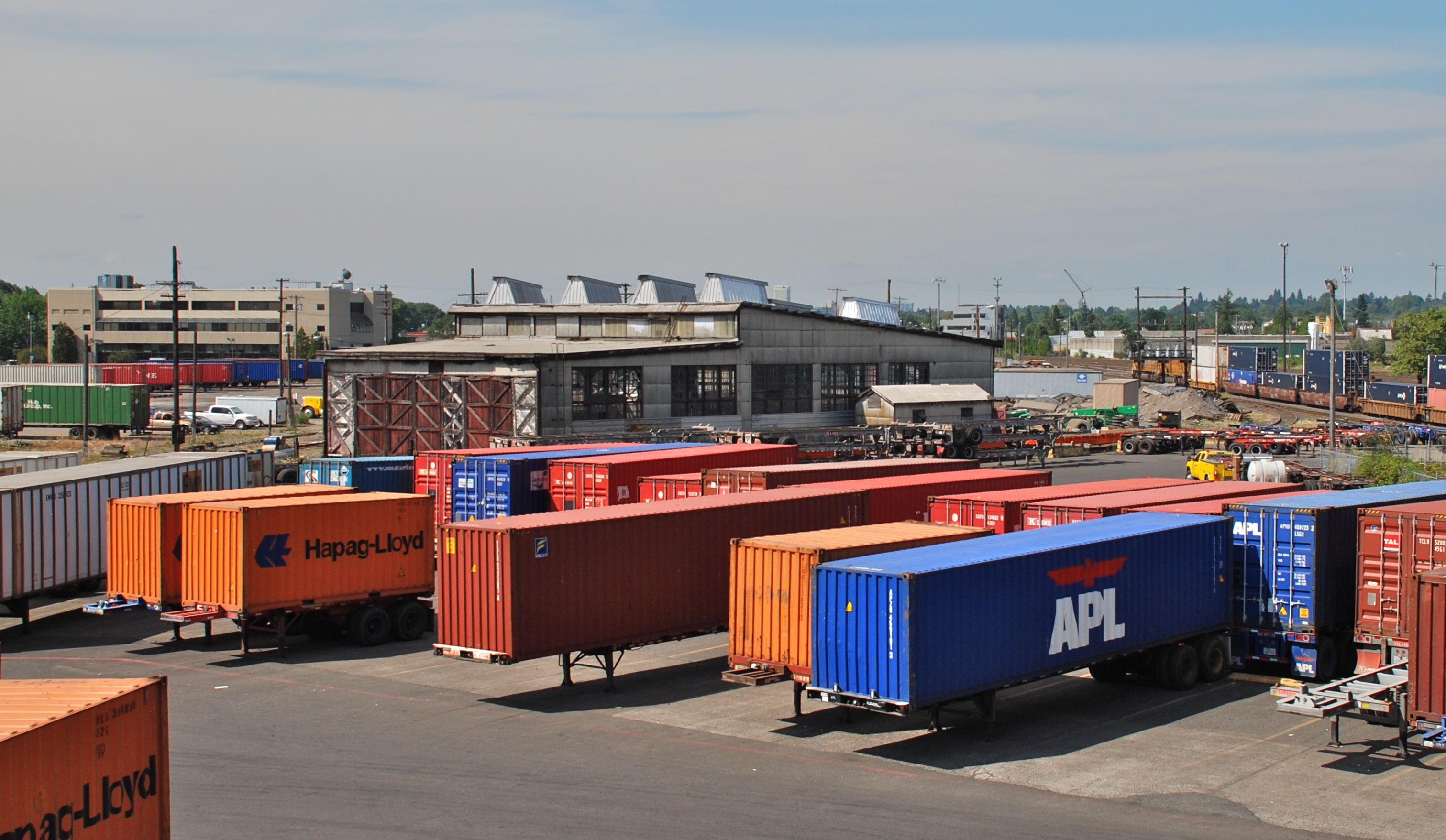
The Brooklyn Roundhouse in August 2012, just before its demolition

ORHF was tasked with finding a new home for the three city-owned steam locomotives and other rail equipment, after planned changes by Union Pacific Railroad (UP) made it apparent that the locomotives would need to be moved out of their longtime home in the UP's (formerly Southern Pacific's) Brooklyn Roundhouse (45.4916°N 122.6454°W), which was a 1941-built roundhouse in Brooklyn Rail Yard in Southeast Portland's Brooklyn neighborhood. ORHF comprises several partner entities, including non-profit railway preservation and railfan groups as well as the city's Bureau of Parks & Recreation.

Proposals to construct a new enginehouse to house the historic locomotives were expanded to encompass a visitor area and eventually an interpretive center. After considering other potential sites for an enginehouse, ORHF reached a lease agreement in 2009 on a site near the Oregon Museum of Science and Industry (OMSI), encompassing about 3 acres (1.2 ha).

== Construction ==
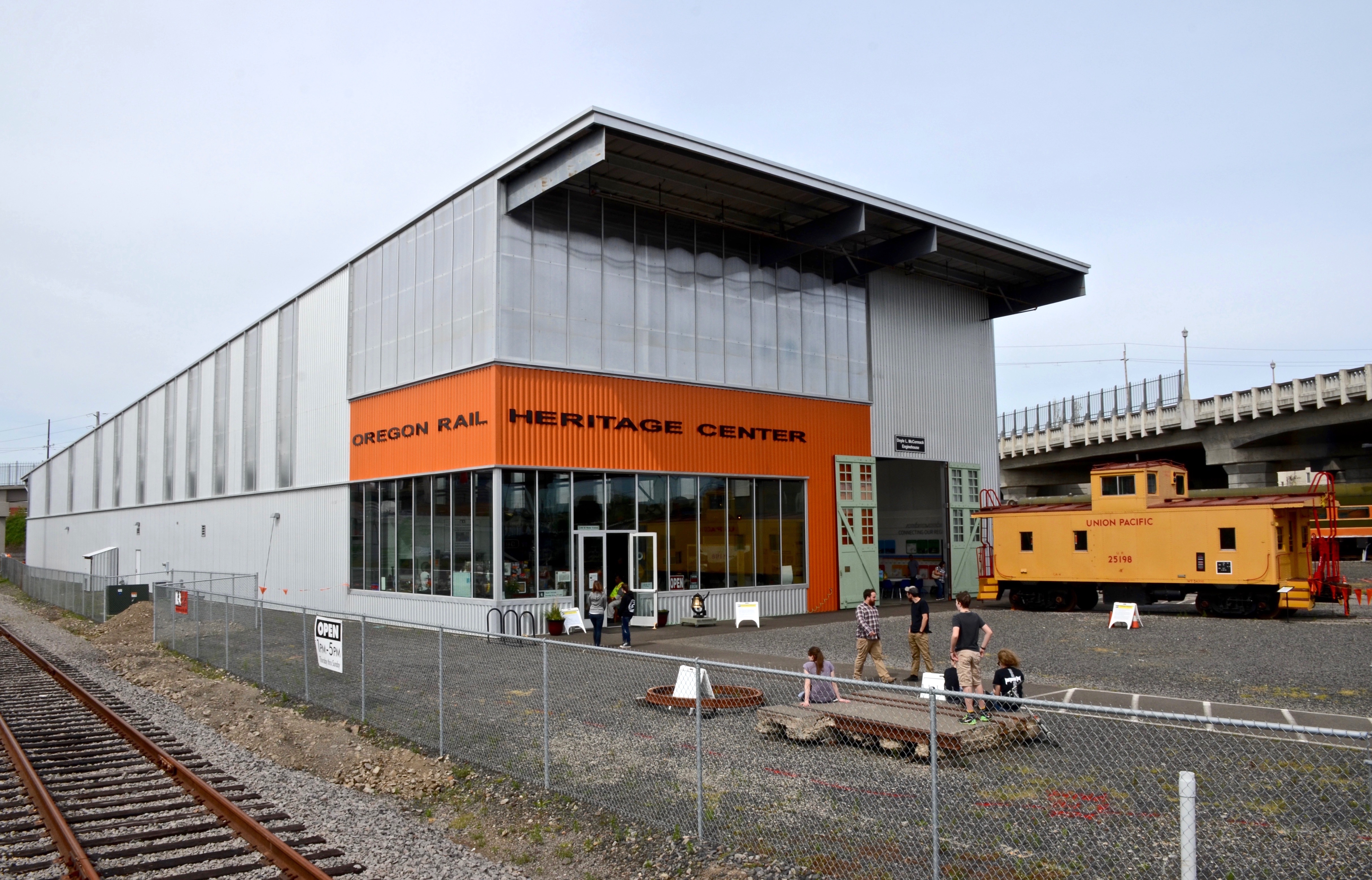
The center in 2016

Ground-breaking for the 20,000-square-foot (1,900 m^{2}) enginehouse took place in October 2011. The three steam locomotives were moved to the site from the Brooklyn Roundhouse on June 26, 2012, and were temporarily placed outdoors, awaiting completion of the enginehouse. With the house fully enclosed (though not completed), the locomotives were moved inside on July 28. Several vintage rail passenger coaches were moved to the site from the Brooklyn Yard (surrounding the roundhouse), where they had been outdoors, and they will continue to be kept outdoors at the new center. The budget for the initial phase of construction was $5.9 million, and funding has come mainly from donations, but with the City of Portland loaning $1 million.

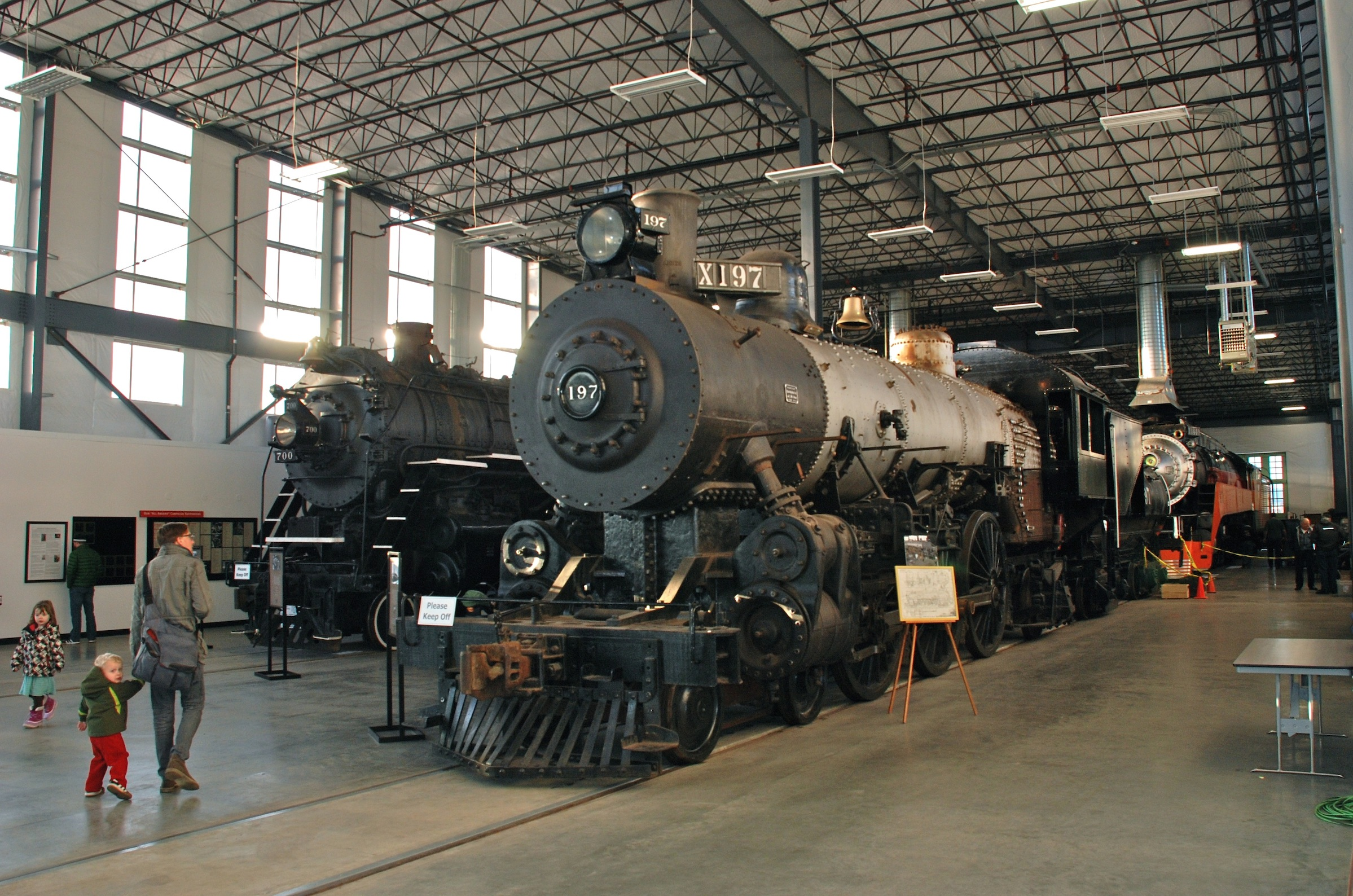
Interior view of the new enginehouse in January 2013 with the three steam locomotives on public view

The Brooklyn Roundhouse was demolished in early September 2012, but the Brooklyn Yard's 1924 turntable, built by American Bridge Company, was removed and placed in storage. A major fund raising effort has since resulted in the turntable components being updated and restored for service, and a new pit excavated and completed at ORHC. As of October 2023, installation of the turntable is nearly complete and operational at ORHC.

The Oregon Rail Heritage Center opened to the public on September 22, 2012. As of early 2023, it is open for visitors Thursday through Sunday, from 1 p.m. to 5 p.m. Originally there was no admission charge. But as of January 2026, admission fees now apply.

== Collection ==
The centerpieces of ORHC's collection are three steam locomotives owned by the City of Portland: Southern Pacific 4449, Spokane, Portland & Seattle 700, and Oregon Railroad & Navigation Co. 197. All were donated to the City of Portland in 1958 and were on static display near Oaks Amusement Park at "Oaks Pioneer Park" until the mid-1970s or later. No. 4449 was moved to the Burlington Northern Hoyt Street Roundhouse in 1974 for restoration and proceeded to become famous nationwide, when it hauled the American Freedom Train throughout much of the country during the United States Bicentennial celebrations of 1975–76. It was thereafter stored and maintained at the Brooklyn Roundhouse between excursions. SP&S 700 moved to the roundhouse from Oaks Pioneer Park in 1986, and OR&N 197 followed in 1996. SP&S 700 is listed on the National Register of Historic Places.

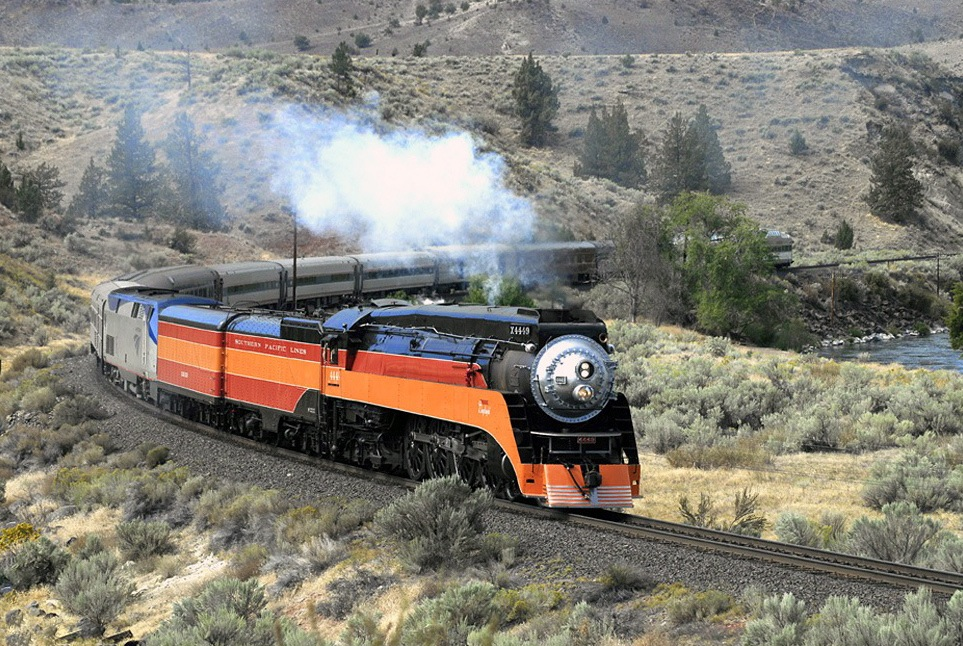
Southern Pacific 4449 leading an excursion in 2006

Union Pacific Railroad diesel switcher locomotive No. 96 was added to the collection in 2016, donated to ORHF by UP. It is an "SW10-class" locomotive, built originally as an SW7 in 1950 by Electro-Motive Diesel (and originally numbered 1821) and rebuilt as an "SW10" by UP in 1982. It arrived at the ORHC in 2017.

Another diesel locomotive switcher was donated to ORHF by the BNSF Railway in 2022. This is unit No. 3613, an EMD SW1000 unit built in 1972. It was restored off-site and moved to the ORHC in October 2023.

In May 2023, the Pacific Northwest Chapter of the National Railway Historical Society donated a 1941 Davenport Locomotive Works built 20-ton, four-wheel gas mechanical switcher locomotive SPMW No. 570, which served nearby at Southern Pacific's Brooklyn yard, to ORHF. It is being restored off-site.

The most recent steam locomotive to join the ORHF collection is Mount Emily Lumber Company Shay 1, which was donated by the Oregon Historical Society in September 2022 to ORHF. It was moved to the ORHC from the City of Prineville Railway in February 2024. The locomotive was moved inside the Oregon Rail Heritage Center in October 2024 to begin restoration work.

Several pieces of private or non-profit partner group owned rolling stock also reside at the center, including other locomotives and several vintage passenger and freight cars. One of the locomotives previously was Nickel Plate Road 190, one of two surviving ALCO PA locomotives left in the United States. This PA locomotive was sold in March 2023 to Genesee Valley Transportation, and was moved to Scranton, Pennsylvania in April/May 2023.

Public facilities at the enginehouse are to be minimal initially, consisting of a few exhibits and an area where restoration work on the locomotives and other equipment can be observed, but ORHF plans to install a full interpretive center later, on the building's future second floor.

The operational steam locomotives are occasionally used on excursion trips, including an annual Holiday Express, and the new enginehouse was sited and designed in such a way as to enable these trips to continue. The rail cars also have access to Oregon Pacific Railroad (OPR) tracks along the Springwater Corridor at this location. However, beginning in Fall 2022, the Holiday Express trips on the Oregon Pacific Railroad will be handled by smaller logging-oriented steam locomotives, as the SP 4449 and SP&S 700 locos are too heavy and long for current track conditions. Union Pacific Railroad's north–south main line runs past the building, and is connected to the Heritage Center's tracks, allowing the locomotives and other rail cars to be moved onto or off of the mainline tracks.

Locomotives owned by ORHF
Locomotive	Builder	Model	Build date	Disposition	Image	Ref.
SP 4449	Lima	4-8-4	May 20, 1941	Operational		
SP&S 700	Baldwin	4-8-4	May 1938	Operational		
OR&N 197	Baldwin	4-6-2	May 1905	Undergoing restoration		
PNWR 1854	EMD	SD9E	April 1955	Donated, awaiting arrival		
Mount Emily Lumber Co. 1	Lima	3-truck shay	August 1923	Donated		
UP 96	EMD	SW10		Donated, operational		
BNSF 3613	EMD	SW1000	1972	Donated, operational(?)		
SPMW No. 570	Plymouth	20 ton	1941	Donated in 2023, off site restoration		

Locomotives formerly owned
Locomotive	Builder	Model	Build date	Current location	Image	Ref.
NKP 190	Alco	Alco PA	March 1948	Genesee Valley Transportation		
NKP 324	Alco	Alco RSD-5	November 1955	Utah State Railroad Museum		

== See also ==
- Culture of Portland, Oregon
- List of museums in Oregon
