= Halloween in Portland, Oregon =

Halloween traditions of Portland, Oregon, United States

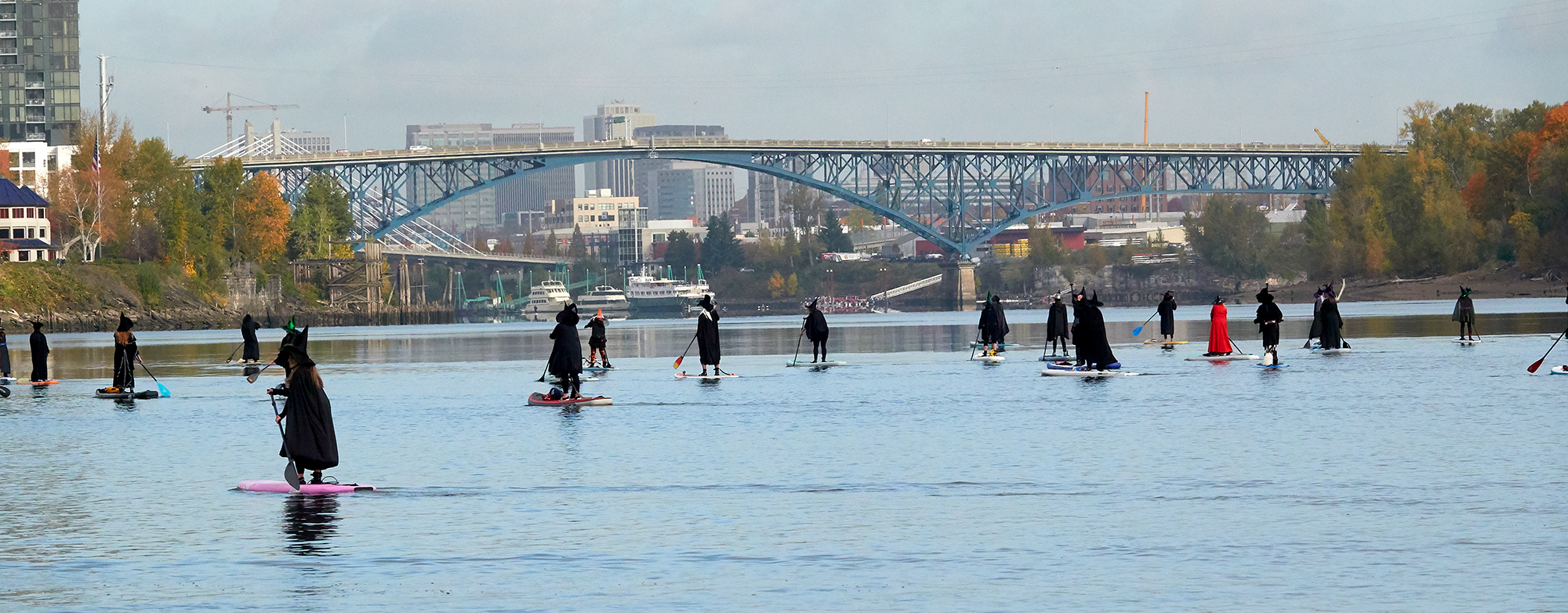
Witch paddle, 2019

The holiday Halloween is celebrated in many ways in the American city of Portland, Oregon. Annual events during the Halloween season have included the witch paddle, a local iteration of Thrill the World, and previously the Doll Asylum. The city hosts many haunted attractions and other Halloween-themed activities and displays each year. Some businesses offer Halloween specials or feature Halloween decorations year-round. The city has also had people wear Halloween costumes at demonstrations, such as during an "emergency" edition of the World Naked Bike Ride during the 2025–2026 protests.

== Events and other activities ==
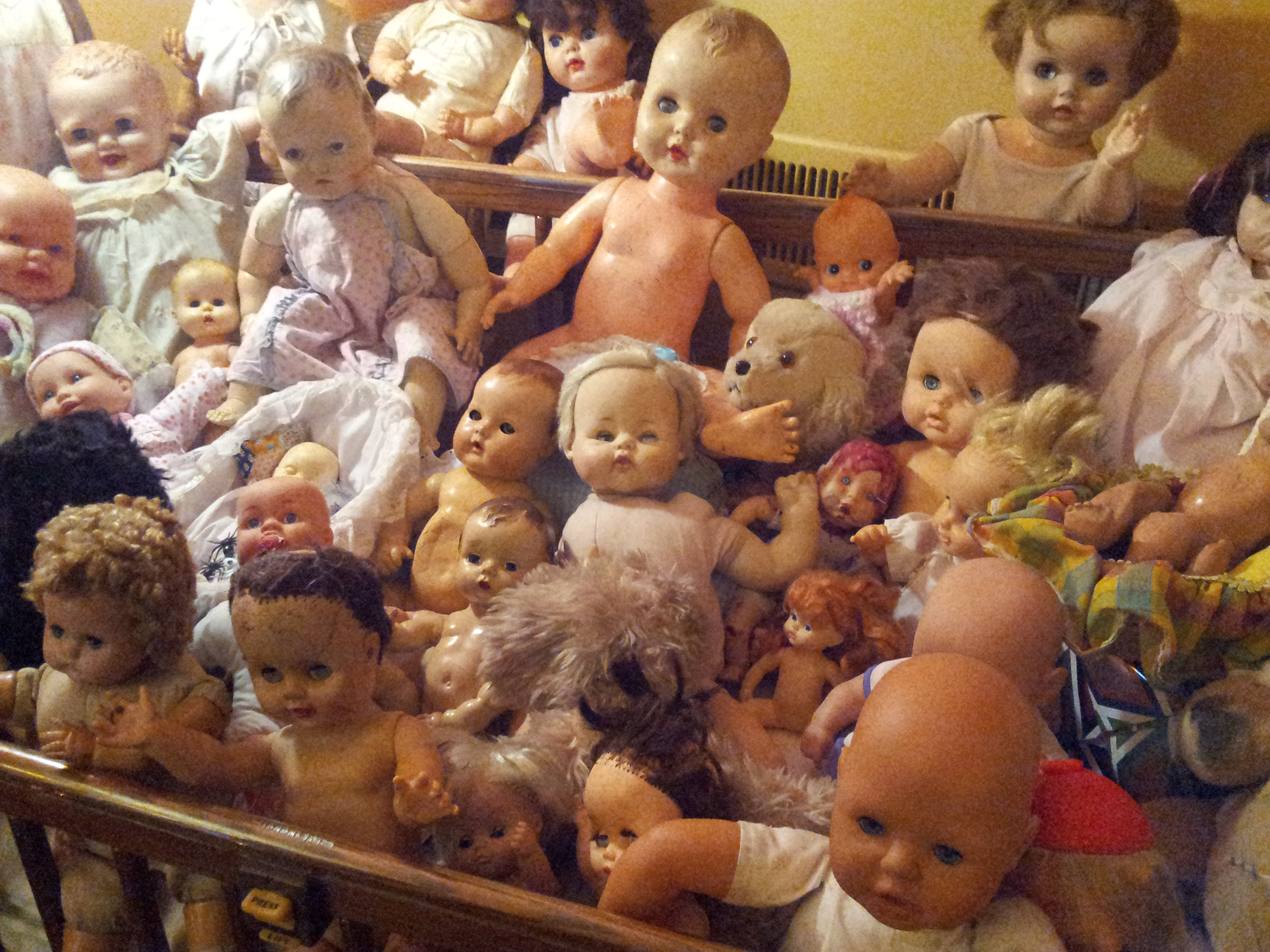
Doll Asylum, 2015

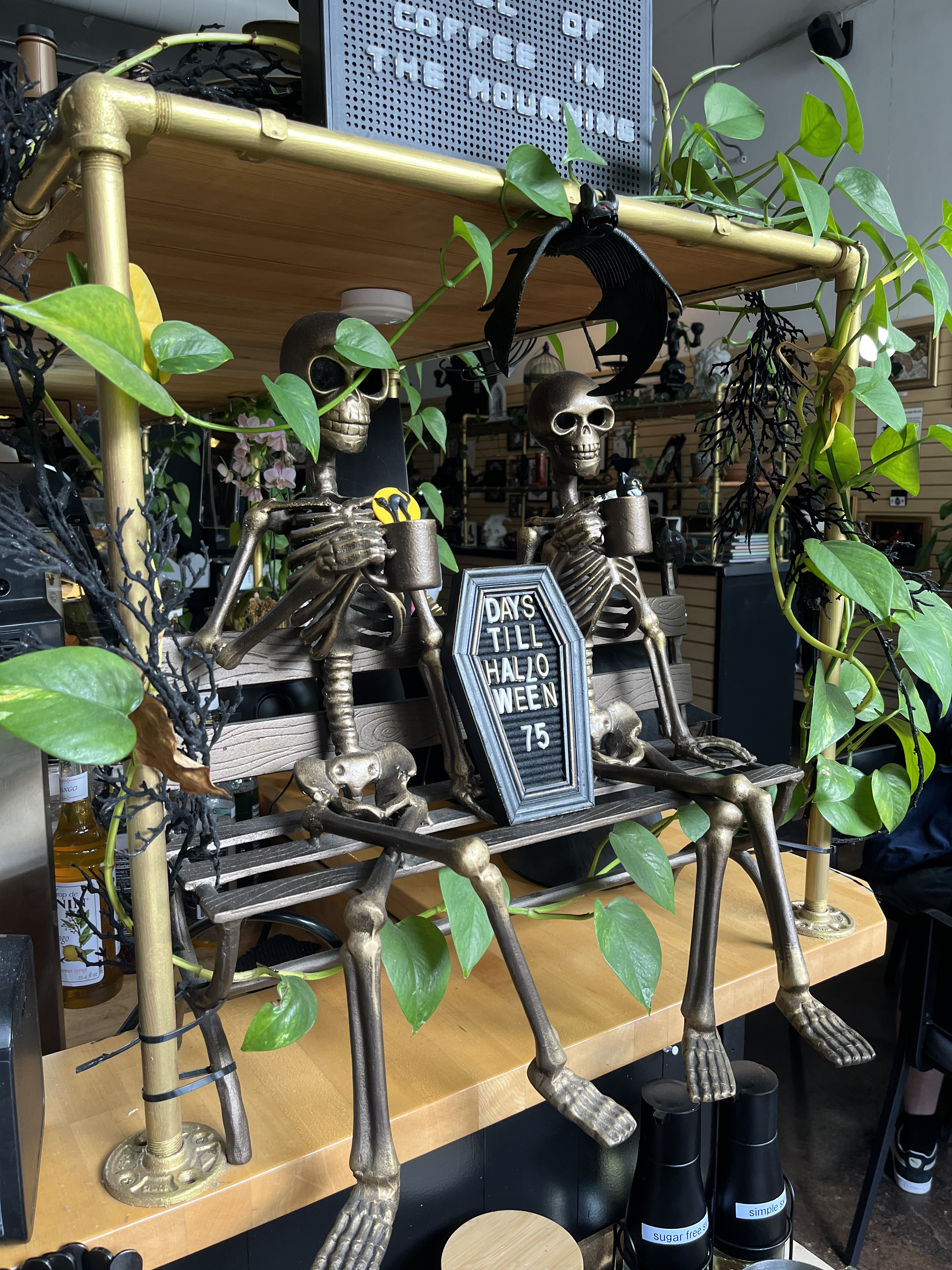
Countdown to Halloween at Memento Mori Cafe, 2025

The annual witch paddle is held during the Halloween season. The ice rink at the Lloyd Center has played Halloween music and allowed guests to wear Halloween costumes. In 2020, the roller derby league Rose City Rollers held a Halloween weekend pop-up at the Lloyd Center's parking garage.

The Portland Erotic Ball, described as the city's "biggest sexiest Halloween party", has been held at the Crystal Ballroom. The local performance company Night Flight has offered Halloween aerial shows called "Fright Night" for over a decade; the event has been held at Alberta Rose Theatre and features aerialists and trapeze artists. The Portland Tribune has described the show as a "queer-gothic circus spoof of The Phantom of the Opera". Phantom PDX has been called "one of Portland's wildest Halloween parties"; the 2014 event was held at White Owl Social Club. A vegan Halloween market was held in 2023. In 2024 and 2025, the Portland Spirit offered "Ghostly Voyage" cruises to the Spirit of Halloweentown festival in St. Helens. The Portland Spirit also hosts the annual "BOO Cruise", which features a costume contest and Halloween music.

In 2025, "Blumenauer Witching Hour" was held on the Blumenauer Bridge in celebration of Day of the Dead and Halloween. A "Halloween Swap Meet" at Oaks Amusement Park in September 2026 featured art, face painting, fortune telling, and tarot card reading. In 2026, Victorian Belle Mansion is hosting the live radio show Scary Home Companion. In 2026, Alberta Rose Theatre will host its fifth annual Haunted Mansion-inspired burlesque show Foolish Mortals: A Haunted Mansion Burlesque Cabaret.

Portland has also held Halloween balls, bar crawls, dance and roller skate parties, drag brunches, and poetry slams, as well as "haunted" corn mazes, events with dogs wearing costumes, and various other performances. Holocene has hosted "Bollywood Horror", described as a costume and dance party, for over a decade. In 2010, Oaks Amusement Park hosted a Halloween Bazaar. The Stage Fright Festival bills itself as the city's "only queer horror theatre festival". The 2026 event had clowns, comedy, puppetry, and scary storytelling.

Formerly in Portland, the Halloween experience Doll Asylum had approximately 1,000 dolls.

=== Cemeteries ===
The volunteer group Friends of Lone Fir has hosted the "Halloween Tour of Untimely Departures" at Lone Fir Cemetery; approximately 2,000 and 1,600 people participated in 2010 and 2011, respectively. The group has also had volunteers spend Halloween night in the cemetery to deter the vandalism of gravestones.

In 2026, Metro invited members of the public to help clean Columbia Pioneer Cemetery, in Northeast Portland's Parkrose neighborhood. Approximately 50 people volunteered.

=== Haunted attractions ===
Exterior of Fear PDX in 2026

Entrance to ScareGrounds PDX at Oaks Amusement Park, 2026

Fear PDX claims to be Portland's largest haunted attraction. ScareGrounds PDX is hosted at Oaks Amusement Park. The park hosted a "haunted drive-thru" in 2020.

Underhill's Season of Screams has been held at Veterans Memorial Coliseum. Journalist Mandy Ferreira included Underhill's experience in Sunset magazine's 2017 list of the ten scariest haunted houses on the West Coast. The FrightTown haunted experience has been held at the Moda Center. Fearlandia is in southwest Portland. In 2020, Fearlandia partnered with Creators of the Night, Davis Graveyard (an annual display in the suburb Milwaukie), and Fear Factory to create a drive-thru attraction at the Clackamas County Fairgrounds because of the pandemic. In 2021, Fearlandia and Under Hill partnered on an event at Veterans Memorial Coliseum.

The Lloyd Center hosted the haunted house experience "13 Days of Terror" in 2022. In 2026, the historic Peace House in the Irvington neighborhood was converted to the haunted house attraction "Crow Manor", which benefited Doernbecher Children's Hospital.

=== Horror film ===
Various theaters have screened horror films for the Halloween season, including Academy Theater, Clinton Street Theater, Hollywood Theatre, and Tomorrow Theatre. The Clinton Street Theater hosts the annual horror film festival GuignolFest, as well as the annual "Horror October" series, which the Portland Tribune has said includes "cult classics, international horror, midnight movies and Halloween-themed oddities".

=== Museums and the Oregon Zoo ===
In 2025, the Oregon Museum of Science and Industry had a "spooky season" edition of its "after dark" series.

The Oregon Zoo hosts the annual event "Howloween", which includes costumed trick-or-treating. The 2021 event also had a scavenger hunt. Animals at the zoo have been gifted pumpkins around Halloween. Costumes have been encouraged for guests attending the annual "Squishing of the Squash", during which Asian elephants crush large pumpkins. In 2025, the zoo shared a "spooky" collection of x-rays of animals ahead of Halloween.

The now defunct Portland Children's Museum hosted a "costumed Halloween quest" with trick-or-treating, "spooky" art projects, and a "slimy sensory experience".

=== Summerween ===
Portland has also seen activities for Summerween, which combines Halloween traditions and summer celebrations, inspired by an episode of the Oregon-set animated TV series Gravity Falls. In 2024, Voodoo Doughnut launched a series of doughnuts for Summerween. The two-day Summerween festival called Ghosts of Summer was established in 2022. It was held at the Oregon Convention Center in 2023 and at the Redd on Salmon Street in 2026.

=== Thrill the World ===
Portland participates in the annual Thrill the World event ahead of Halloween, which sees people dress as zombies and dance to Michael Jackson's song "Thriller" (1983). The local branch of Thrill the World is called Thrill Portland. According to KOIN, "The event aims to break down barriers by connecting people of all religions, race, gender identities and economic backgrounds through dance." It has also served as a fundraiser; the 2014 event raised funds for Q Center's Sexual Minority Youth Resource Center.

Thrill the World was held at Holocene in 2007 and in Old Town Chinatown in 2015. It was held at Irving Park in 2016, with a second performance planned at Pioneer Courthouse Square in downtown Portland. Thrill the World was held at Irving Park again 2025.

=== Trick-or-treating ===
Sign with the text "Trick or Treat?" and an illustration of a jack-o'-lantern, Southeast Portland, Oregon, 2026

Various locations such as Kennedy School, Lan Su Chinese Garden, and Multnomah Village have hosted trick-or-treating. Businesses along Alberta Street in Northeast Portland have hosted "Trick or Treat Alberta Street". Division Street, Fremont Street, and Parkrose have also hosted trick-or-treating.

"Woodstock Spooktacular" is held in southeast Portland's Woodstock neighborhood. In 2022, writers for Portland Monthly said trick-or-treating in southeast Portland's Eastmoreland and Reed neighborhoods is "legendary".

== Decorations and displays ==
Local artist Mike Bennett installed Crypto Zoo ahead of Halloween in 2020 and 2021. According to Willamette Week, "his main objective [was] to keep the spirit of monster season alive" during a year when trick-or-treating was impacted by the pandemic. Bennett released a series of Halloween decorations in 2023. In 2026, Mike Bennett Studios hosted Dead Media Video Rentals, a haunted house-themed immersive art attraction.

=== Northeast Portland ===
An annual display in Northeast Portland's Alameda neighborhood attracts hundreds of people. Crestfallen Manor in Northeast Portland has displayed elaborate Halloween decorations for three decades.

=== Southeast Portland ===
Little Ghost Library, 2026

One house in southeast Portland has hosted a large display since 2020. Known for participating in PDX Sidewalk Joy, the house's Halloween display has approximately 100 skeletons, including one inspired by Post Malone called "Post Mabone", as well as 50 pumpkins. Since 2024, Rachel Rochester has stocked the Little Ghost Library at Southeast 18th Avenue and Tolman Street with ghost-related trinkets each October.

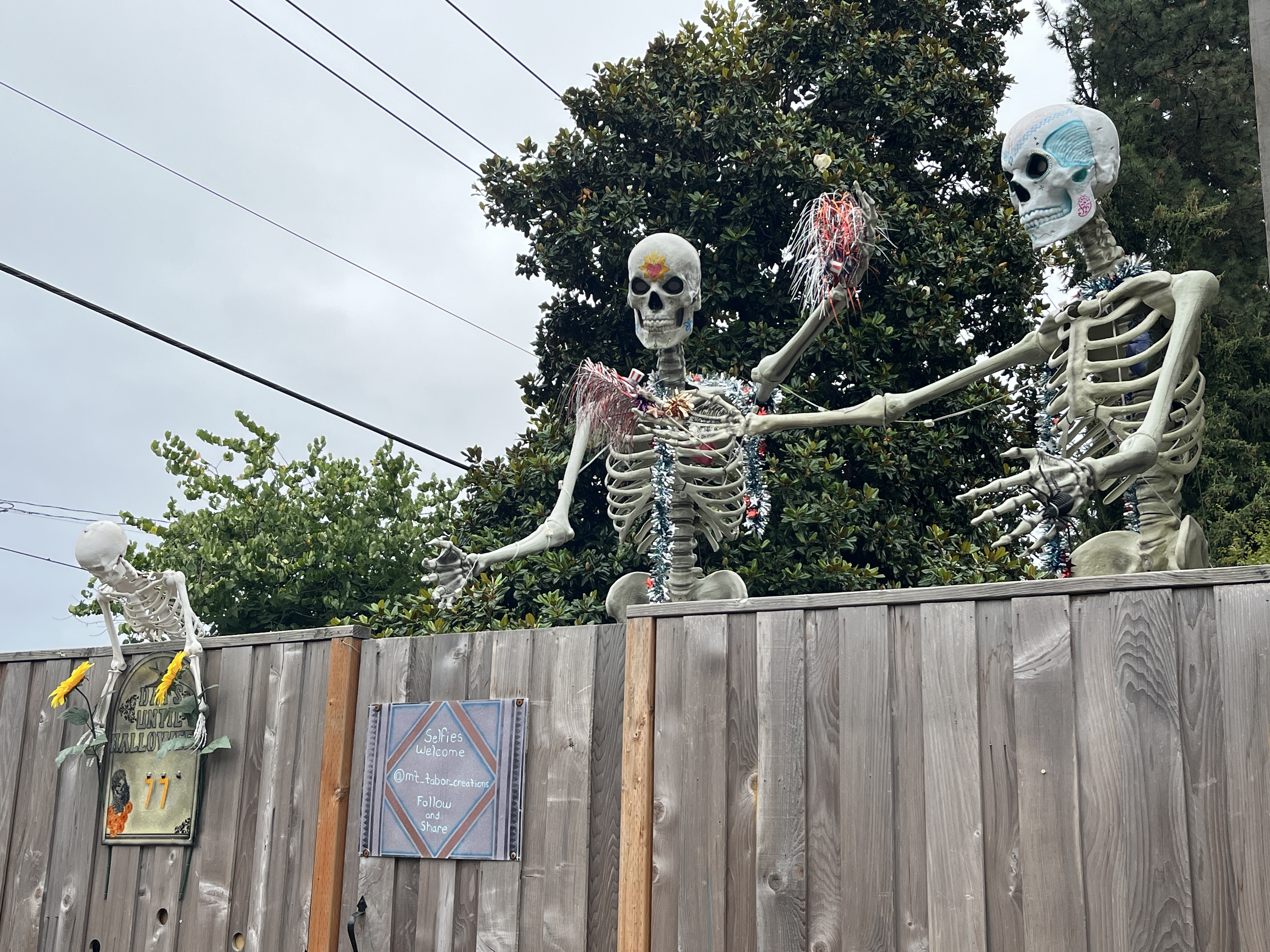
Mt. Tabor Creations display in southeast Portland in August 2026, with skeletons and a countdown of the number of days until Halloween

The Day of the Dead and Halloween display at Mt. Tabor Creations has large skeletons and a spider, as well as an ofrenda for people to leave photographs of deceased family members and pets. The cornfield-themed display at Shadows on Center Street has fog and sound effects. In 2025, Pumpkin Acres in southeast Portland had a Halloween wedding theme, with approximately 280 pumpkins, lighting and sound effects, and a tribute to The Nightmare Before Christmas.

=== Southwest Portland ===
One house in southwest Portland, near Tigard, has a pirate-themed display with an animatronic skeleton pirate, a jail with a skeleton dog holding a key, and holograms projected onto windows. Neighbors on the block have expanded the display.

== Halloween costumes ==
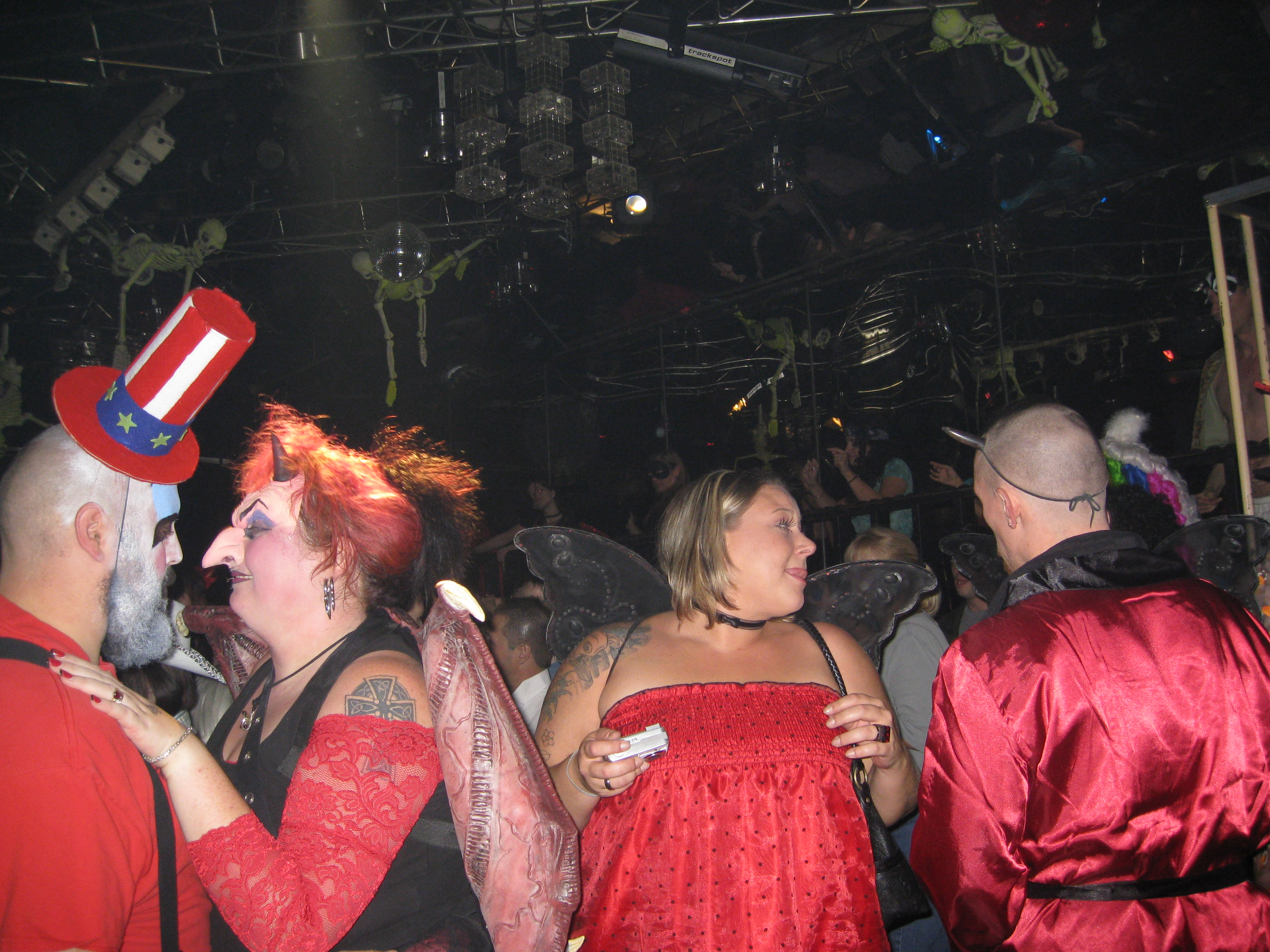
People wearing Halloween costumes at the defunct gay bar and nightclub Embers Avenue in 2008

One Portland school banned Halloween costumes in 2011.

In 2018, several Portland Trail Blazers players wore Halloween costumes before a game. Damian Lillard and Maurice Harkless dressed as Stone Cold Steve Austin and the Chappelle's Show character Tyrone Biggums, respectively.

In 2022, KOIN said the top five most popular Halloween costumes in the Portland metropolitan area were fairies, dinosaurs, characters from Stranger Things and Star Wars, and devils, based on Google search engine analysis. The most popular costumes in the metropolitan area in 2025 were the characters Rumi, Zoey, Mira, and Derpy from the animated film KPop Demon Hunters, as well as labubus.

Some participants of the "emergency" edition of the World Naked Bike Ride during the 2025–2026 protests in Portland wore Halloween costumes.

== Business ==
Interior of Memento Mori Cafe, 2025

Spirit Halloween operated a location on 82nd Avenue in 2009. There were eleven temporary locations in the Portland metropolitan area in 2012. There were no Spirit Halloween stores in the city in 2024 or 2025.

In 2022, Hey Love hosted a Halloween pop-up Black Lagoon. The bar The Uncanny hosted a Halloween pop-up called House of Unholy in 2023 and 2024. Among notable bars that have served Halloween-themed cocktails are Creepy's, Raven's Manor, and The Uncanny. According to Axios Portland, "It's Halloween year-round at Raven's Manor, but October is an especially eerie time to head to the downtown bar."

Coffee shops and restaurants like Cheese & Crack Snack Shop and Memento Mori Cafe, which displays Halloween decorations all year, have also offered Halloween-themed food and drink options. In 2026, Doe Donuts offered Halloween-themed doughnuts and other desserts. Portland-based ice cream company Salt & Straw has offered a Halloween series with seasonal flavors.

== See also ==
- Crows in Portland, Oregon
- Culture of Portland, Oregon
- Reportedly haunted locations in Oregon
