= Doll Museum =

Doll Museum may refer to one of the following:

- Doll Asylum, an annual Halloween experience and makeshift doll-themed museum, in Portland, Oregon, United States
- Museum of Lifestyle & Fashion History, Palm Beach County, Florida, United States
- Rosalie Whyel Museum of Doll Art, Bellevue, Washington, United States
