= Farragut Park =

Public park in Portland, Oregon, U.S.

Coordinates: 45°34′49″N 122°40′14″W

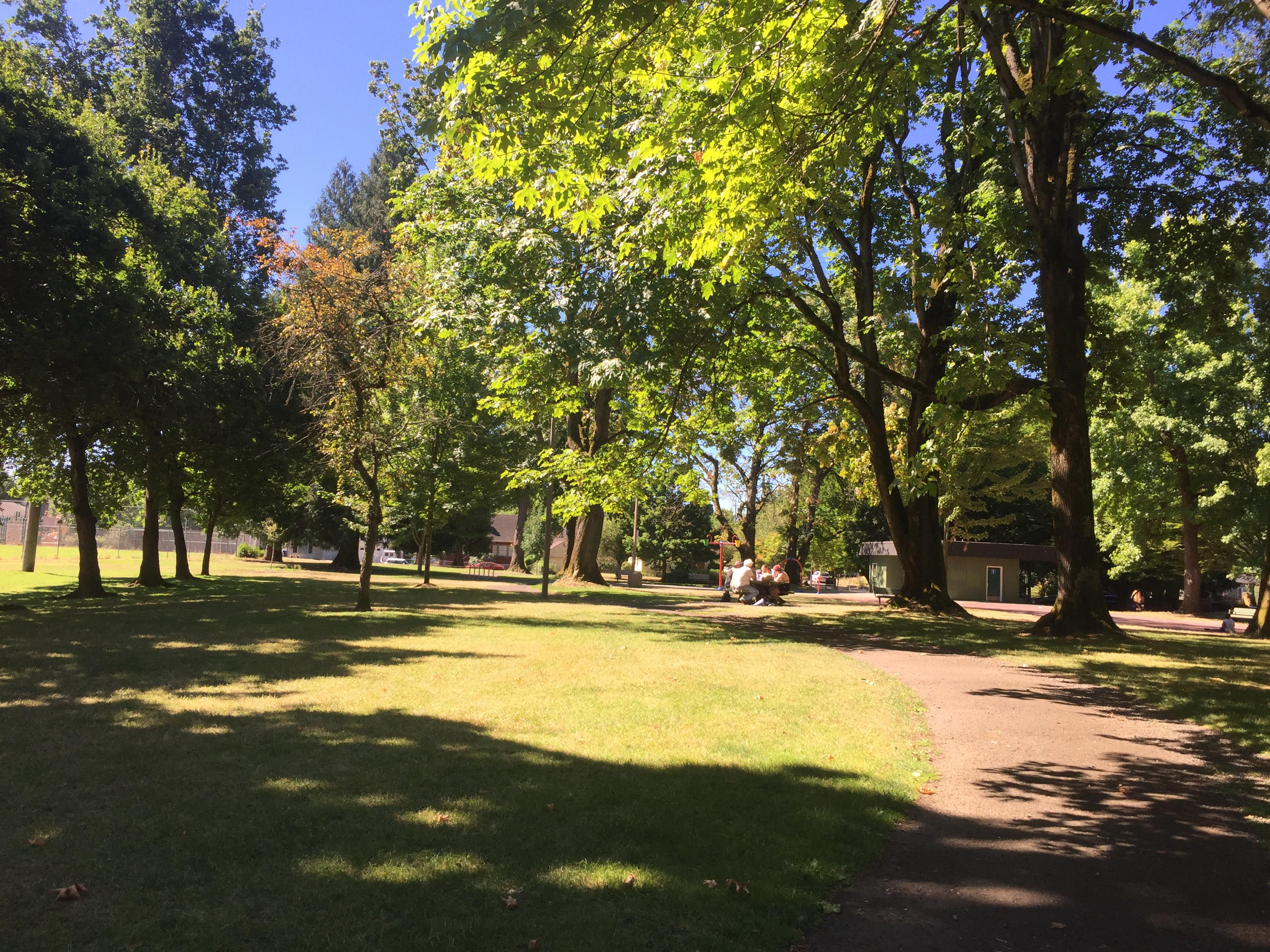
- One of the park's many paths, 2017
- Interactive map of Farragut Park
- Location: N Kerby Ave. & Farragut St. Portland, Oregon, United States
- Area: 13.98 acres (5.66 ha)
- Created: 1940
- Operator: Portland Parks & Recreation
- Status: Open 5 a.m. to midnight daily

Farragut Park is a public park in the Piedmont neighborhood of Portland, Oregon. It is bordered by North Kerby Avenue, Farragut Street, and the railway line.

The 14-acre park contains a playground, a baseball diamond, basketball courts, a water playground, accessible restrooms, and picnic tables.

Acquired in 1940, the park, like the adjacent street, was named after David Farragut, a naval officer in the American Civil War.

In July of 2024, renovations to the park were completed. This included a renovation of the basketball court, additional play structures in the playground, and replacing the bark chips in said playground with mats. New restrooms were also added near the water features.

There are multiple lamps along the paths that do not function as intended. This will likely be fixed when they are fitted with new bulbs.

== See also ==
- List of parks in Portland, Oregon
