= GuignolFest =

Film contest and studio

- Genre: Horror film festival, Filmmaking competition
- Frequency: Annual
- Venue: Clinton Street Theater
- Locations: Portland, Oregon, United States
- Country: United States
- Years active: 2008–present
- Founder: Dylan Hillerman
- Organizer: GuignolFest Productions (Dylan Hillerman and Julia Reodica)
- Website: guignolfest.com

GuignolFest (/ɡiːnˈjɔːlfɛst/) is an annual 72-hour horror film contest and festival held each October in Portland, Oregon. Founded by Dylan Hillerman in 2008 and co-produced since 2013 with Julia Reodica, the event challenges registered teams of independent filmmakers to conceive, write, shoot, and edit a short horror film within a single weekend. The completed films are screened publicly at the Clinton Street Theater, where awards are presented.

The festival takes its name from the Grand Guignol, the legendary Parisian theatre of the late 19th and early 20th centuries that specialized in naturalistic horror and shock performance. The Portland Mercury has described GuignolFest as "a 72-hour filmmaking challenge that traditionally culminates in a raucous gore-splattered screening night."

== History ==
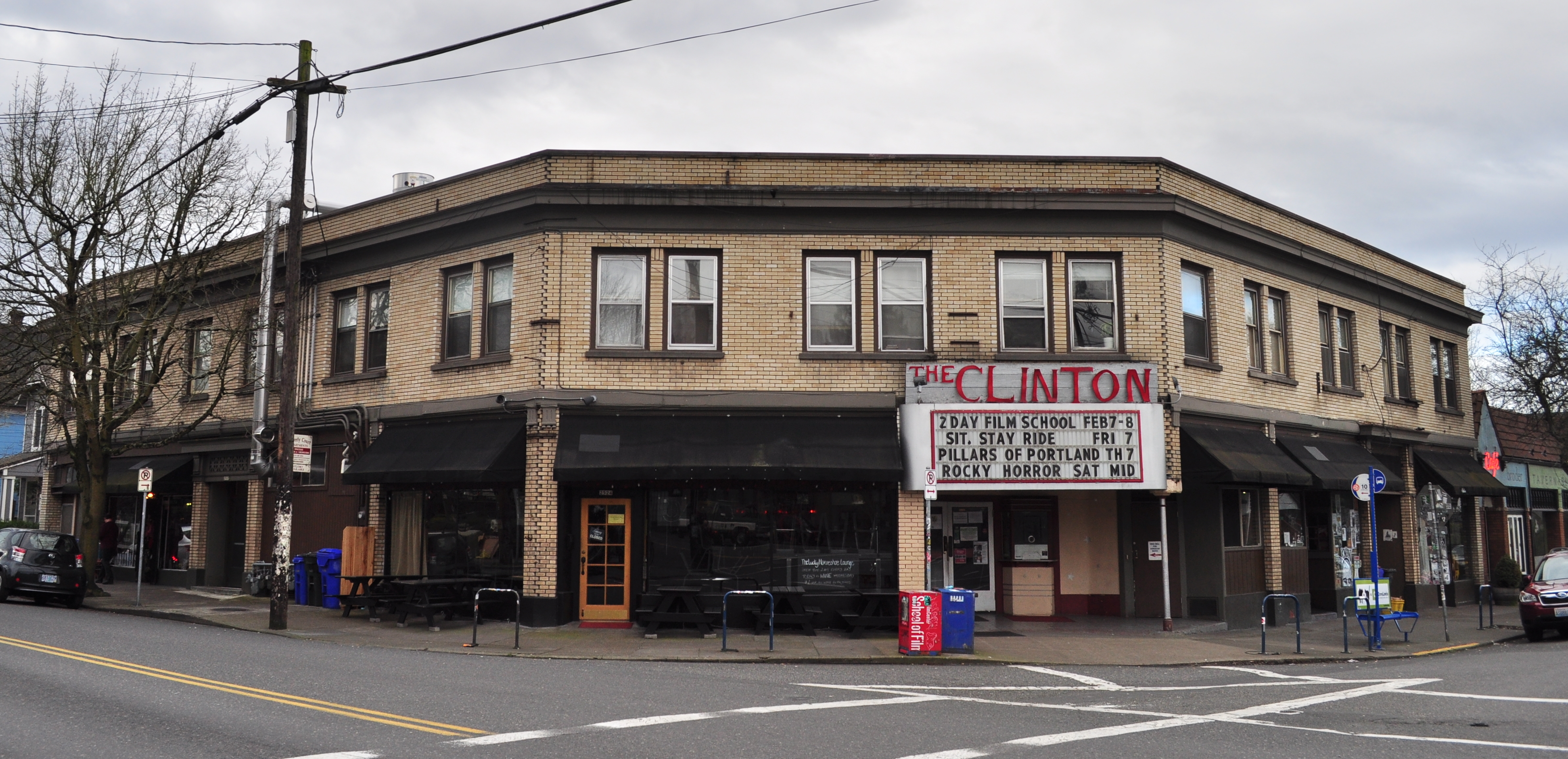
Clinton Street Theater (exterior pictured in 2015)

According to Hillerman, quoted in Oregon ArtsWatch, the festival originated from "a drunken moment when I was in a bar in my mid-thirties and realized that I didn't have a legacy of any kind." The first official GuignolFest was held in 2009 at the Red Flag Bar in Portland. The festival continued at that venue through its 4th Annual edition in 2012.

In 2013, GuignolFest moved to the historic Clinton Street Theater in Southeast Portland, where it has been held ever since. That same year, Julia Reodica joined as co-producer. Hillerman and Reodica met while performing together at Portland's haunted house FrightTown and later married following a trip to Transylvania, Romania.

The 10th Annual GuignolFest in 2018 set a record with 18 competing teams, 11 of which were new to the contest. The 2020 edition was held entirely online due to the COVID-19 pandemic, with all entry fees donated to the Clinton Street Theater's fundraiser to help sustain the venue during its closure. ""Willamette Week"" noted that "the Clinton's online options are almost all local, DIY productions, including titles from the recent quarantine edition of local horror film festival Guignolfest."

== Format ==
Each year, registered teams gather at a kick-off event where each team draws a randomly assigned horror subgenre. Teams then have 72 hours to write, shoot, and edit their film. Completed films are submitted by a deadline and screened publicly at the Clinton Street Theater, where a jury and audience members award prizes.

The subgenre list has included options such as corporate horror, drug horror, grindhouse, ghost, occult, musical, vampire, psychological, haunted object, foreign horror, sci-fi, slasher, holiday, monster, erotic, environmental, and zombie.

Since 2020, the contest has operated in two competitive tiers: a "Legacy Category" for returning teams and a "Ghoul Category" for newer teams.

== Cultural Impact ==
GuignolFest has become one of Portland most distinctive annual film events, in a city which hosts several film related festivals. In particular it has become an annual Halloween tradition for Oregon's independent film community.

The festival has also served as a platform for social commentary. In 2018, Oregon ArtsWatch noted that organizers anticipated politically charged films, with co-producer Julia Reodica observing: "We know people have something to say. We can't wait to see what kind of horror they're going to bring to the screen this year, because we have a lot of angry people."

== Media coverage ==
GuignolFest has received coverage from multiple Portland-area media outlets throughout its history.

Selected press coverage
Year	Outlet	Title / Notes
2013	PDX Monthly	Listed in "A Guide to Spooky Screenings This Month"
2017	Willamette Week	"GuignolFest is Portland's Original 72-Hour Horror Film Contest"
2018	Oregon ArtsWatch	"Masters of Horror" by Bennett Campbell Ferguson
2020	Southeast Examiner	"72 Hours: GuignolFest Celebrates 12 Years"
2020	Willamette Week	Listed among "20 Best Things to Do, Watch and Livestream This Fall"
2023	Portland Mercury	Featured in "An Astrological Guide to Portland's Film Festival Scene"
2024	KEZI 9 News	"Portland GuignolFest Returns for Its 16th Year" (TV news segment)

== See also ==
- Culture of Portland, Oregon
- Halloween in Portland, Oregon
- Independent film
- List of film festivals in the United States
