= Piedmont, Portland, Oregon =

Piedmont
- Neighborhood
- Location in Portland
- Coordinates: 45°34′28″N 122°40′15″W
- Country: United States
- State: Oregon
- City: Portland

Government
  - Association: Piedmont Neighborhood Association
  - Coalition: Northeast Coalition of Neighborhoods

Area
  - Total: 0.97 sq mi (2.50 km^{2})

Population (2010)
  - Total: 7,025
  - Density: 7,280/sq mi (2,810/km^{2})

Housing
  - No. of households: 2,983
  - Occupancy rate: 96% occupied
  - Owner-occupied: 1,844 households (62%)
  - Renting: 1,030 households (35%)
  - Avg. household size: 2.36 persons

Piedmont is a neighborhood in the north and northeast sections of Portland, Oregon, United States. The Piedmont subdivision was platted in 1889 by Edward Quackenbush, and promoted in an early flyer as "The Emerald, Portland's Evergreen Suburb, Devoted Exclusively to Dwellings, A Place of Homes." The original subdivision, now known as "Historic Piedmont," includes parts of the Humboldt and King neighborhoods, as well as the modern Piedmont neighborhood south of Rosa Parks Way.

In 1947, after a failed attempt to build a NABISCO factory in the Rose City Park neighborhood, a factory location along Columbia Boulevard was chosen. The plant was completed in August 1950.

== Features ==
- Farragut Park
- Peninsula Park

== Popular culture ==
In the book The Zombie Survival Guide by Max Brooks, there is a faux zombie attack recorded in which zombies attacked Piedmont and the citizens attempt to hide in the cave mines.

== See also ==
- Doll Asylum, an annual Halloween experience hosted at a private residence from 2010 to 2017 when the owners moved to Astoria, Oregon
