= Creepy's =

Bar and restaurant in Portland, Oregon, U.S.

- The bar's exterior, 2026
- Interactive map of Creepy's

Restaurant information
- Established: September 2017
- Owners: AJ Fosik; Jason Radich; Matt Relkin
- Location: 627 Southeast Morrison Street, Portland, Multnomah, Oregon, 97214, United States
- Coordinates: 45.5174°N 122.6590°W
- Website: creepyspdx.com

Creepy's is a themed dive bar and restaurant in Portland, Oregon, United States. It was opened by AJ Fosik, Jason Radich, and Matt Relkin on Morrison Street in southeast Portland's Buckman neighborhood in 2017.

== Description ==
The themed dive bar Creepy's operates on Morrison Street in southeast Portland's Buckman neighborhood. Willamette Week said the venue is "best described as a polished, nightmare carnival-themed parlor" that is "strategically dim and unabashedly kooky". The interior has images of children with large eyes, a 5-foot tall portrait of John Quincy Adams with moving eyes, and paintings of clowns. There are also animatronic dolls and wind-up toys, approximately 7-foot tall hand-painted film posters from the Ghana film industry, and vintage sweaters made by beer companies during the 1960s and 1970s. Much of the decor was collected by the owners over years. According to Eater Portland, the "eclectic" Creepy's has hosted disc jockeys playing new wave music, as well as screenings of cult films such as Godzilla vs. Mechagodzilla (1974) and Phenomena (1985).

=== Menu ===
Among East Coast-inspired food options is a breakfast sandwich made with Taylor Ham, which is popular in New Jersey, and a spicy chicken sandwich, which was inspired by the Commodore in Brooklyn. Creepy's has also served a smash burger, French fries, deep-fried peanuts, hushpuppies with sriracha, and nachos. The drink menu includes cocktails with coffee (including a frozen option), Harvey Wallbangers, and other tiki drinks. The Pickletini is among the bar's most popular cocktails. Others are called Coffin Cutter Marg, Dark Arts, Ghost Machine, The Grasshopper, and La Bruja. Creepy's also offers beer and wine.

== History ==
Creepy's opened in September 2017, in the space previously occupied by cowboy-themed bar Charlie Horse Saloon. Co-owners include artist AJ Fosik, Jason Radich, and Matt Relkin, who also own the bar and restaurant White Owl Social Club. The bar had weekly bingo hosted by Quinn Richards, also known as Quinn the Clown, as of 2026.

== Reception ==
Eater Portland said Creepy's was "a new contender for the weirdest bar in Portland — one that will appeal to robot engineers, beer-memorabilia fashionistas, and fanatics of Stephen King's I.T. alike". The website's Nick Woo included the Hot Breast Sandwich in a 2020 list of fourteen "outstanding" fried chicken sandwiches in the city. Brooke Jackson-Glidden included the bar in Eater Portland's 2024 overview of Portland's best "spooky, eerie" establishments.

In The Oregonian's 2017 "guided tour of 12 great Portland theme bars", Michael Russell described Creepy's as an "old-timey carnival freak show". Willamette Week called the spicy chicken sandwich "great" and said, "Creepy's isn't creepy, unless you think the circus is creepy." The business placed second in the Best Cocktail Bar category of the newspaper's annual 'Best of Portland' readers' poll in 2025. It won in the same category in 2026.

Matt Kirouac included Creepy's in Tasting Table's 2022 list of thirteen "uniquely strange" restaurants in Portland. He wrote, "The bar on the near east side would feel like your run-of-the-mill craft cocktail bar if it weren't for the fact that nearly every inch of the walls is decorated with creepy clowns, taxidermy, sultry Elvira portraits, and dolls that look like they come to life at night." Portland Monthly included Creepy's in a 2023 list of the city's "must-visit" theme bars.

== See also ==
- List of dive bars
- Theme restaurant
