= Memento Mori Cafe =

Coffee shop in Portland, Oregon, U.S.

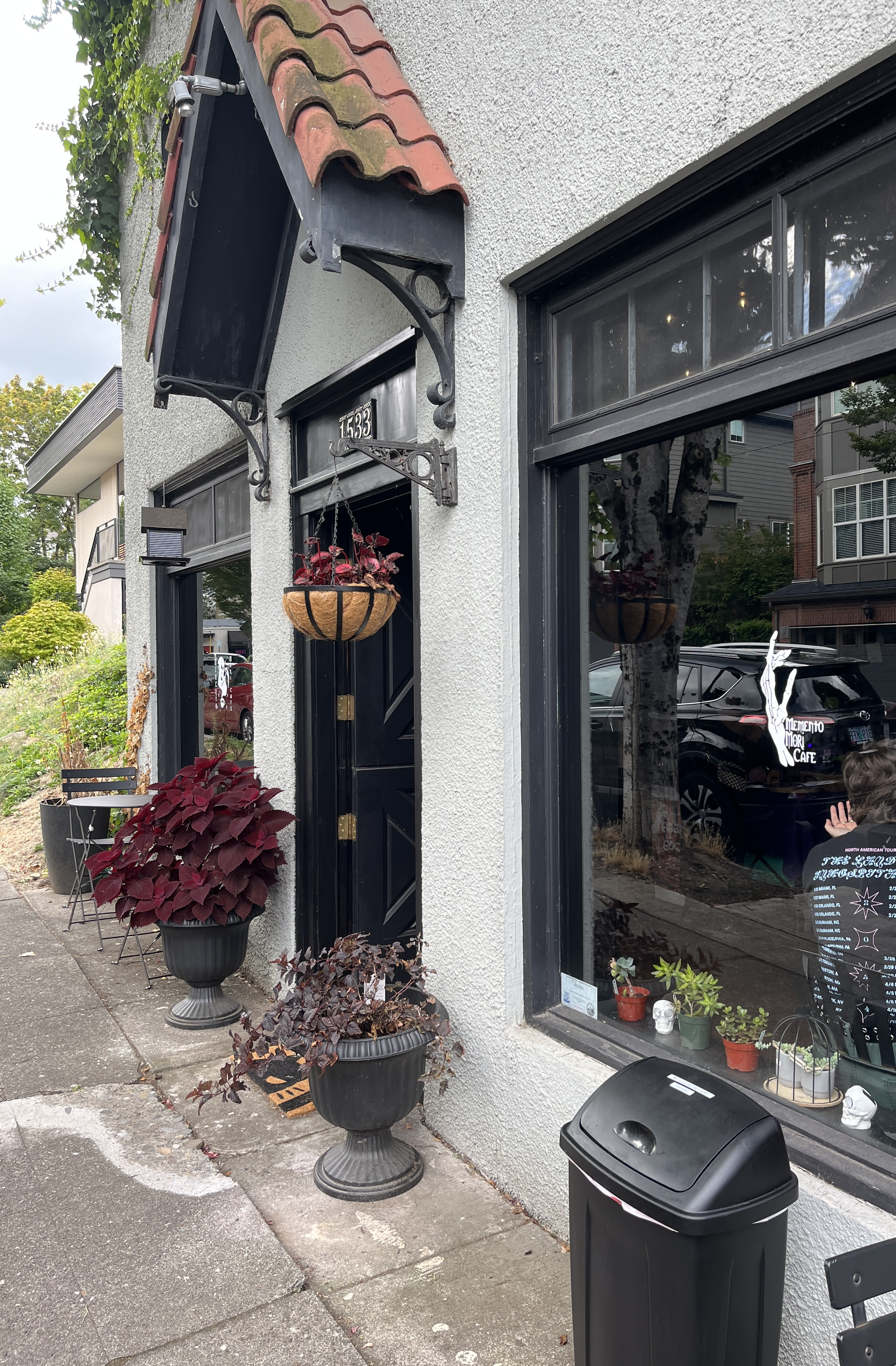
- The cafe's exterior, 2025
- Interactive map of Memento Mori Cafe

Restaurant information
- Established: October 12, 2024
- Owners: Correna and Justin Hernandez
- Location: 1533 Northwest 24th Ave #100, Portland, Multnomah, Oregon, 97210, United States
- Coordinates: 45.5340°N 122.7009°W
- Website: mementomoricafe.com

Memento Mori Cafe is a goth-themed vegan coffee shop in Portland, Oregon, United States. Owners Correna and Justin Hernandez began operating the cafe in northwest Portland's Northwest District in October 2024.

== Description ==
The goth-themed vegan coffee shop Memento Mori Cafe operates on 24th Avenue at the intersection of Raleigh Street in the Northwest District of northwest Portland. The business name comes from the Latin phrase meaning "remember you must die" (or "remember death"). Eater Portland has described Memento Mori as a "macabre and mystical" cafe with a "dark and eclectic" atmosphere. The interior has a goth art, skeletons, black ceramic vase in the shape of a human heart, a tic-tac-toe game with skull and cross bones, and a wall with images of "shadowy" figures and skulls. According to Willamette Week, "Original art and a few shelves of goth home goods (think year-round Halloween decorations) round out the merchandise offered here."

=== Menu ===
Oat milk-based coffee drinks include a mint mocha called the Werewolf and another with honey and lavender called the Wolfsbane. The signature blended drinks are called Goth-a-Chinos; varieties include the Crypt Keeper, which is a caramel white chocolate hazelnut latte, and the Pushing Daisies, which is an iced chocolate chip cookie frappe. There is also the mint chocolate-flavored Grave Digger, the Redrum, which has coconut and raspberry, and a mint cookie mocha option. The Raven is an iced coffee with black cocoa, the Red Rum is a coconut raspberry frappe, and the Vampira is a red velvet latte. In addition to coffee and espresso drinks, Memento Mori serves lemonades and milk teas. The cafe has also offered seasonal specials during October, including a blood orange lemonade, a matcha white chocolate apple drink and a pumpkin tres leches latte.

The food menu includes the Cemetarium Salad with vegan barbecue smoked "chicken" and varieties of toasts (referred to as "bread of the dead"). Among toast options is the Wednesday, which has black sesame paste and vegan cream cheese. The cafe also serves bagels and salads (called "mourning bread" and "cemetery clippings", respectively), as well as sandwiches and desserts. Memento Mori has also served pastries with strawberry filling, shaped like bats and coffins, as well as pumpkin muffins shaped like skulls. It has also stocked macarons from the pop-up vegan patisserie Camellia. Sugar cubes at Memento Mori are also shaped like skulls.

== History ==
Owners and spouses Correna and Justin Hernandez opened family-operated the coffee shop on October 12, 2024.

In 2024, Memento Mori invited guests to bring photographs of loved ones and flameless candles to display on its ofrenda. On November 1 and 2, the cafe offered champurrado and kits for cake decorating. The business was among 33 restaurant in Portland participating in World Vegan Month. In January 2025, Memento Mori hosted a fundraiser to benefit animal shelters impacted by the Palisades Fire. In 2026, the business closed for a day to support the January 30 protests against ICE. Memento Mori also participated in a fundraiser to support women entrepreneurs in 2026.

== Reception ==
Alex Frane included Memento Mori in Portland Monthly's 2024 list of "our favorite tricks and treats" at Portland eateries. The business ranked third in the Best Vegan Coffee Shop category of VegNews's annual restaurant awards in 2026. Memento Mori Coffee also received the editors' vote.

== See also ==
- Halloween in Portland, Oregon
- List of vegetarian and vegan restaurants
