= Doll Asylum =

Halloween experience and museum

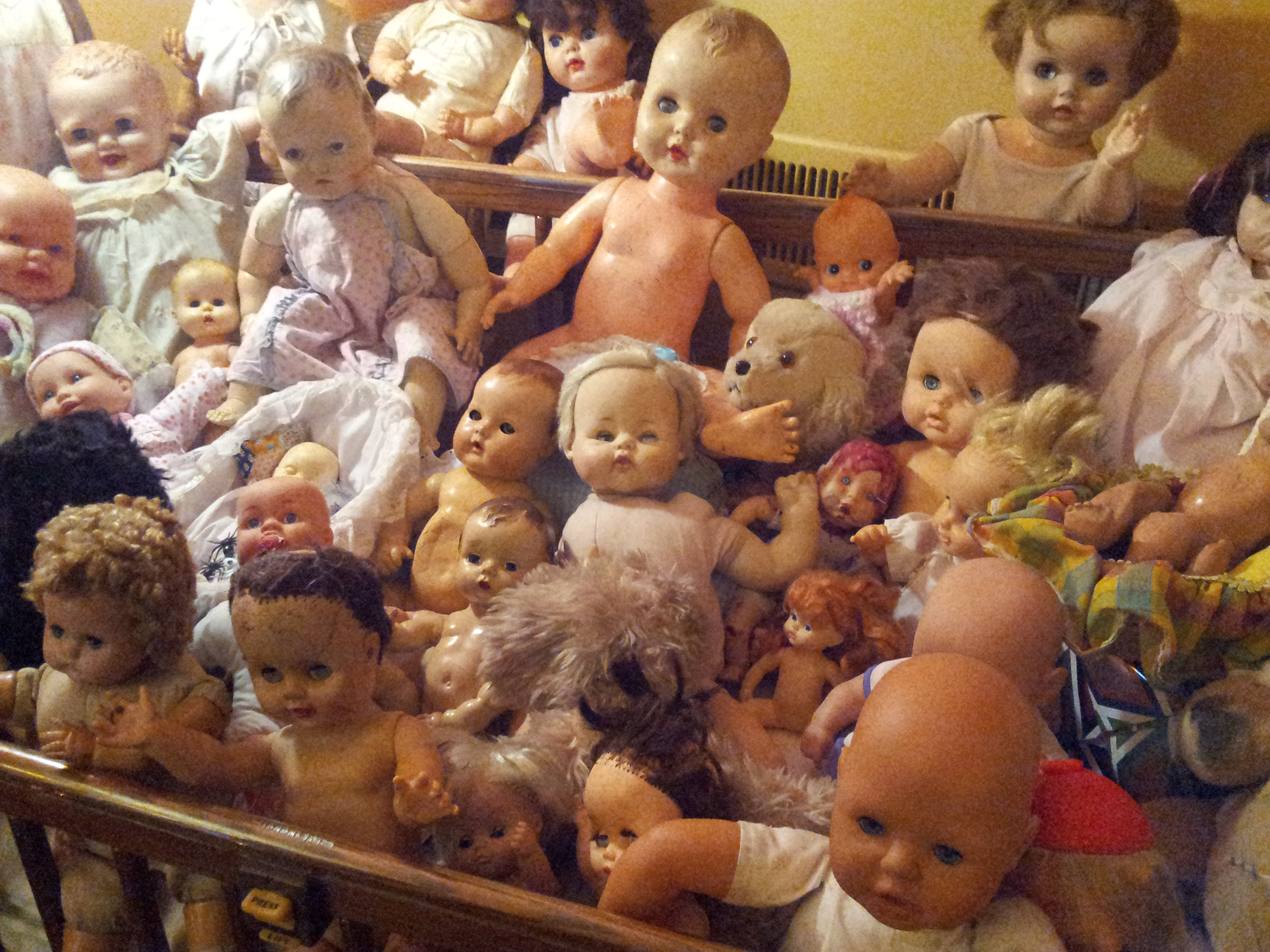
- Crib filled with dolls, 2015
- Status: Active
- Frequency: Annually
- Locations: Piedmont, Portland, Oregon
- Coordinates: 45°34′08″N 122°40′38″W
- Country: United States
- Years active: 2010–2016 (Portland, Oregon); 2017 – present (Astoria, Oregon)
- Founder: Mark Williams; Heidi Loutzenhiser
- Website: dollasylum.com

The Doll Asylum is an annual Halloween experience and makeshift doll-themed museum, originally hosted at a couple's private residence in Portland, Oregon's Piedmont neighborhood, in the United States. In 2017, the Doll Asylum moved to Astoria, Oregon.

== Description and history ==
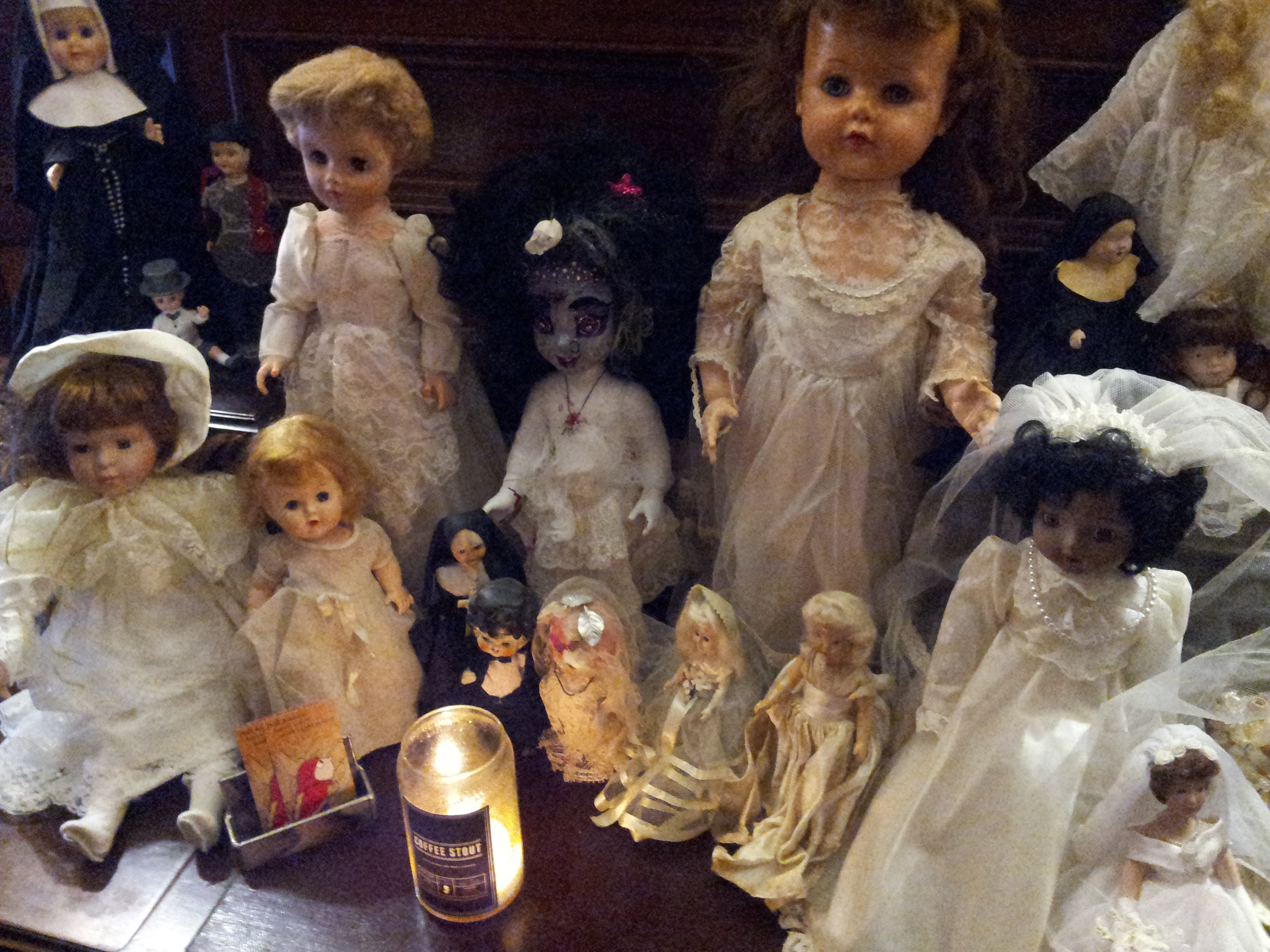
Doll display, 2015

Mark Williams and Heidi Loutzenhiser originally decided to host an open house as a way to meet their new neighbors, having moved to the neighborhood in 2010. They considered a bird theme until Williams saw a doll leaning against a tree across the street from his house. He has said of the event's evolution and impact: "It started with just some family friends coming over, now we're on the internet. I just love seeing how they react to the little things we do out and about... it just makes me happy."

Since its inception, visitors have added "demented" and "macabre" dolls to the collection. By 2012, the couple had more than 700 dolls, and their collection passed the 1,000 doll threshold by 2015. The first 75, however, were left to Loutzenhiser when her mother died. Williams has said of the collection, "Dolls are perfect. Because they're cheap. And they creep people out. All of these are donated or bought from Goodwill or other thrift shops." The Doll Asylum is open at no cost for a limited time each Halloween season.

In 2017, the Doll Asylum moved to Astoria, Oregon, where open houses continue around Halloween.

== Reception ==
The event's attendance has grown over time, as has the size of the doll collection. One KOIN reporter said of his experience, "I didn't really know what to expect upon arriving to the home that has a hundred or so dolls dwelling inside. What I found was a family who absolutely loves Halloween… and they love celebrating it with everyone." Michael Lloyd of The Oregonian called the asylum "creepy, but fun". In 2015, the paper included the event in its list of five ways to celebrate Halloween. The paper said, "North Portland's Doll Asylum is a truly creepy Halloween experience. Breaking the mold from the haunted house thrills, the makeshift doll-themed museum displays old dolls in vast numbers around a house – creepy enough in their own right."

== See also ==
- Culture of Portland, Oregon
- Halloween in Portland, Oregon
- List of museums in Portland, Oregon
