= Oaks Amusement Park =

Amusement park in Portland, Oregon

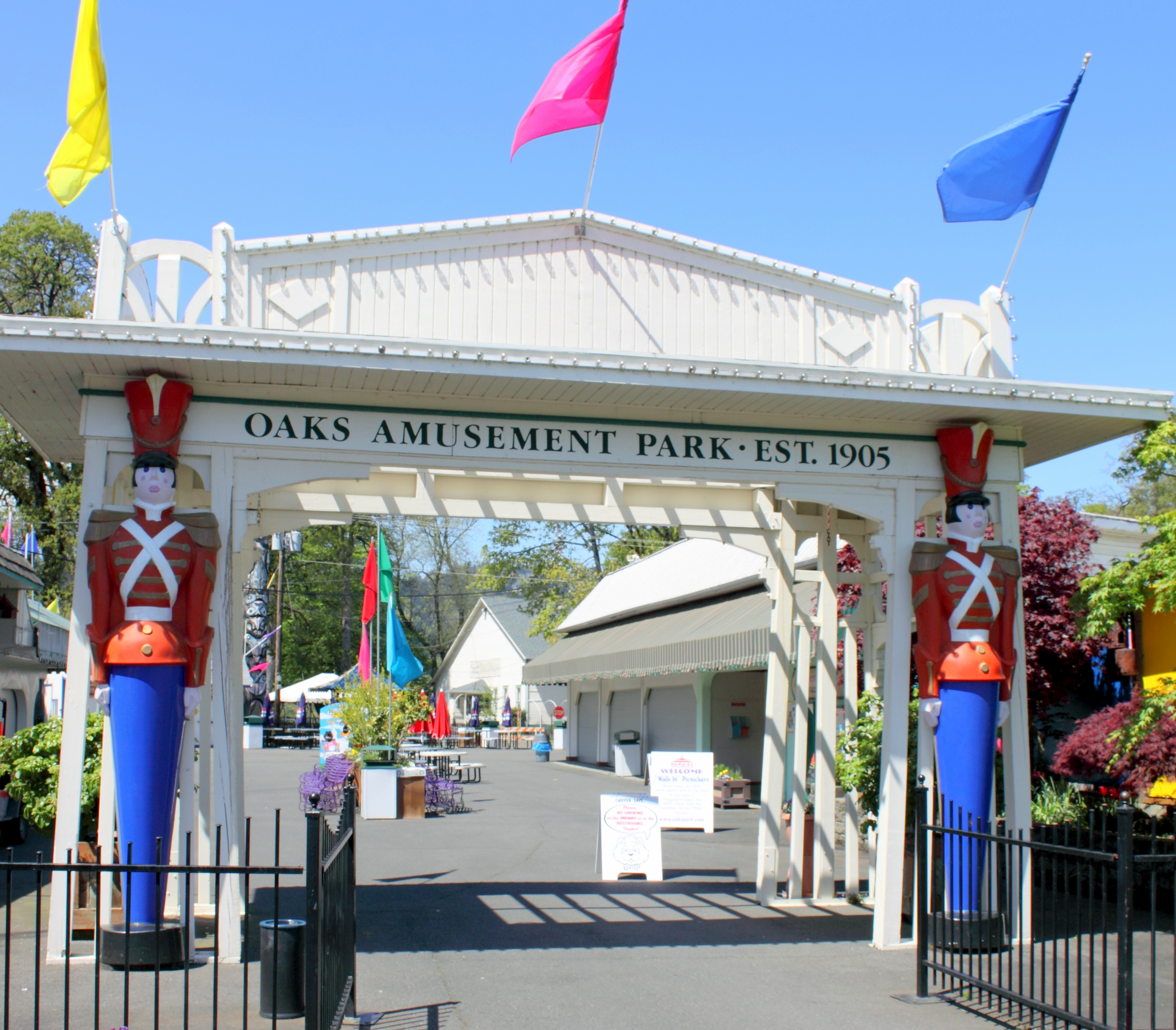
- Entrance to Oaks Park (remodeled in 2001)
- Interactive map of Oaks Amusement Park
- Location: 7805 SE Oaks Park Way; Portland, Oregon, U.S.
- Coordinates: 45.4730°N 122.66061°W
- Opened: May 30, 1905; 121 years ago
- Owner: Oaks Park Association
- Slogan: Where the fun never ends!
- Operating season: Spring weekends and daily during summer (rides); Tuesdays–Sundays (rink)
- Area: 44 acres (18 ha)

Attractions
- Total: 24
- Roller coasters: 2
- Website: www.oakspark.com

Oaks Park is a small amusement park located 3.5 miles (5.6 km) south of downtown Portland, Oregon, United States. Opened in May 1905, it is one of the oldest continually operating amusement parks in the country.

The 44-acre (18 ha) park includes midway games, about two dozen rides that operate seasonally, a skating rink that is open all year, and picnic grounds. It is also home to the Herschell–Spillman Noah's Ark Carousel, a historic wooden carousel built in 1912.

== History ==
The park, conceived as an attraction timed to accompany the 1905 Lewis and Clark Centennial Exposition, was built by the Oregon Water Power and Railway Company and opened on May 30, 1905, during a period when trolley parks were often constructed along streetcar lines. It attracted 300,000 visitors during its first season, and continued to attract about that many patrons throughout its first decade of existence. (Note: This trolley park had to be sold in 1925 due to change in laws preventing utility companies from owning entities not connected with their major product. In this case, the trolley park was built to increase ridership of the Oregon City, Bellrose and Estacada trolley lines. John Cordray purchased "The Oaks Resort" operating company (not the land) early in 1925 shortly before he died. Edward Bollinger purchased it from Cordray's widow. Via a gentlemen's agreement, Edward and Robert Bollinger purchased the land in 1943; however, only Edward's name was on the transaction. Edward amended his will to honor their "gentleman's agreement" with his son. This will was not honored as Edward re-married without updating it. Robert purchased the portion that was awarded to Edward's widow. The last payment was made in 1951.) Describing the moral panic of working-class entertainment venues opened at the time, a city council member described Oaks Park as "an immoral place" with "more drunkenness there than he had seen at any place in the City".

In the early 1920s, the park was sold to John Cordray, one of its managers. After Cordray died in 1925, Edward Bollinger, Oaks Park's superintendent, bought all but the land from Cordray's widow; Bollinger acquired the land in 1943. Some of the park's earliest rides included Chute the Chutes, a chute ride that whisked the riders down a steep incline plunging into a small man-made lake; the Barrel of Fun, a funhouse which included screaming skeletons, mazes of mirrors, and dark dead-end hallways; and the Mystic River Ride, a boat ride that traveled through darkened tunnels. The park also featured a floating bathhouse anchored along the river at the south end of the park, as well as a dance pavilion, which attracted famous acts from around the world, including the Boston Symphony Orchestra, the John Philip Sousa Marching Band, and Patrick Conway and his World Famous Band.

In 1948, the Vanport flood submerged Oaks Park for thirty days, killing a third of the bluff's oak trees, warping most of the rides, and resulting in damage to the rink that took five months to repair; the next year, Bollinger's son Robert took over after his father's death. The damage prompted the owners to rebuild the rink floor on airtight iron barrels, which would float in the event of another flood; the floats worked as planned during the area's Christmas flood of 1964 and the Willamette Valley Flood of 1996.

For many years, three steam locomotives and other historic rail equipment were kept near the amusement park on City of Portland owned park land (called Oaks Pioneer Park), on static display. These included Southern Pacific 4449, from 1958 to 1974; Spokane, Portland and Seattle 700, from 1958 to 1986; and Oregon Railroad & Navigation Co. 197, from 1958 to 1996. Although no longer at Portland's Oaks Pioneer Park (renamed in 1988 to Oaks Bottom Wildlife Refuge), the three locomotives all remain in Portland, and since 2012 they are residing at the Oregon Rail Heritage Center. (Note: The fourth locomotive stored with these three was the No. 418 Finnish War Hero steam locomotive, from cira 1957 to 1980.) Two years after the Jantzen Beach Amusement Park closed in 1970, the Oregon Journal reported Oaks Park "may be on the verge of a renaissance"; three years later Sellwood's local newspaper, The Bee, reported "30,000 people a month still come during the summer."

In 1985, Robert Bollinger donated Oaks Amusement Park to the 501(c)(3) non-profit Oaks Park Association, which continues to operate the park to this day. The mission of the Oaks Park Association is the preservation and perpetuation of the historic amusement park as an affordable, safe, and family-friendly recreation attraction open to the general public.

The park gained recognition for its appearance in Free Willy. Many of the current and former attractions like Screamin' Eagle appeared in the movie as do the trailer Randolph reside while the roller skating rink served as the entrance to the aquatic theater where Willy was held captive in a tank which was actually shot at Six Flags México (formerly Reino Aventura) in Mexico.

The park celebrated 100 years of continuous operation in 2005, making it among the oldest in the U.S.

In 2024, the AtmosFear ride got stuck at the top with a full load of riders during a school field trip. It, and its riders, were stuck for around 20 minutes.

== Attractions ==
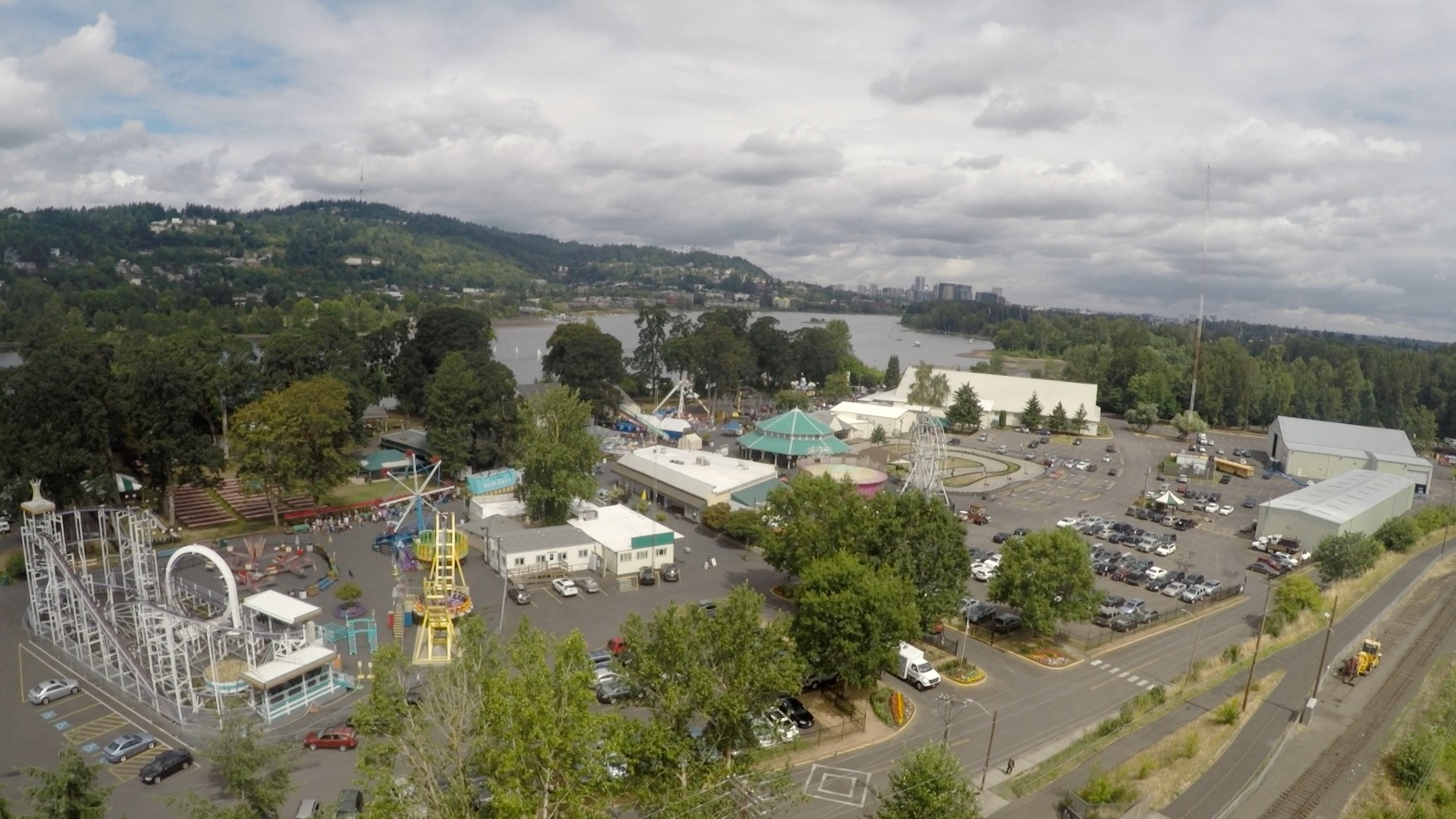
Aerial view of Oaks Amusement Park, showing the attractions

=== Current attractions ===
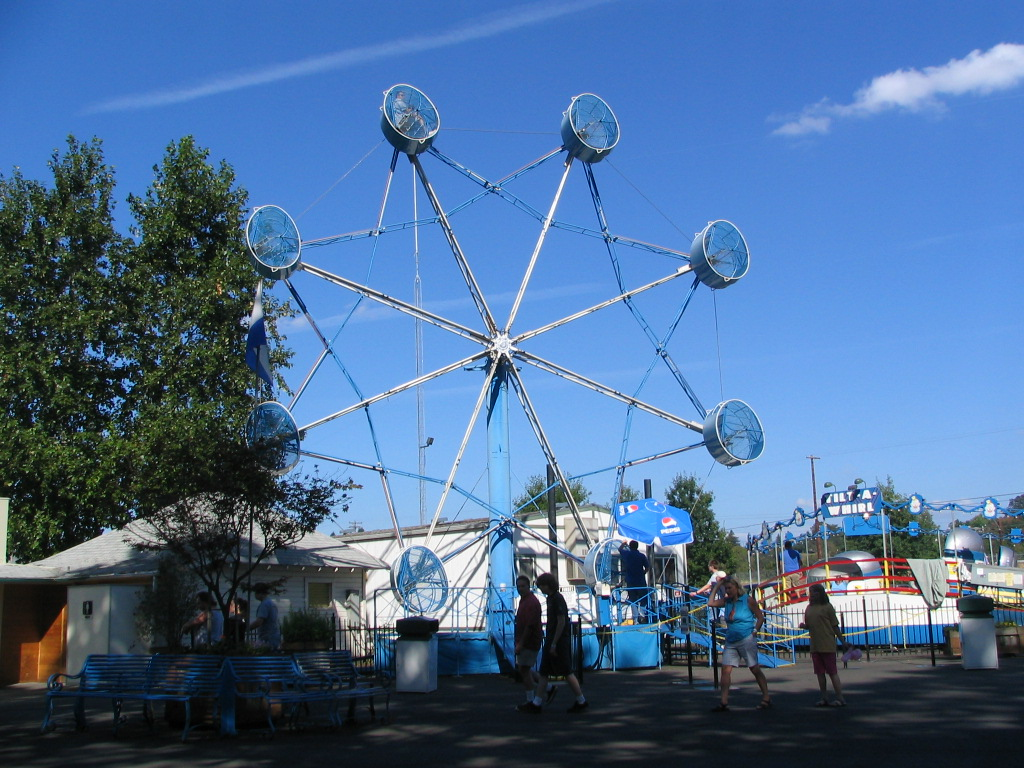
The Rock-O-Plane at Oaks Park

Park rides and midway games are open weekends during spring and daily during summer. Rides include the following:

=== Roller coasters ===
Name	Manufacturer	Type	Design	Section	Year opened	Description
Adrenaline Peak	Gerstlauer	Steel	Sitdown	South End	2018	A Euro-Fighter roller coaster
Zoom Coaster	E&F Miler Industries	Steel	Sitdown	North End	1999	A small coaster targeted at children

=== South End ===
Name	Manufacturer	Year opened	Description
Disk’O	Zamperla	2007	A Disk’O flat ride
Oaks Park Train	C.P. Huntington	2013	A 2 ft (610 mm) narrow gauge train
Rock-O-Plane	Eyerly Aircraft Company	1960	A Rock-O-Plane ride, one of a few still in operation
Zero Gravity	Battech Enterprises	2017	A Zero Gravity spinning flat ride that tilts upwards
Spider	Eyerly Aircraft Company	1970	A classic spider ride

=== East End ===
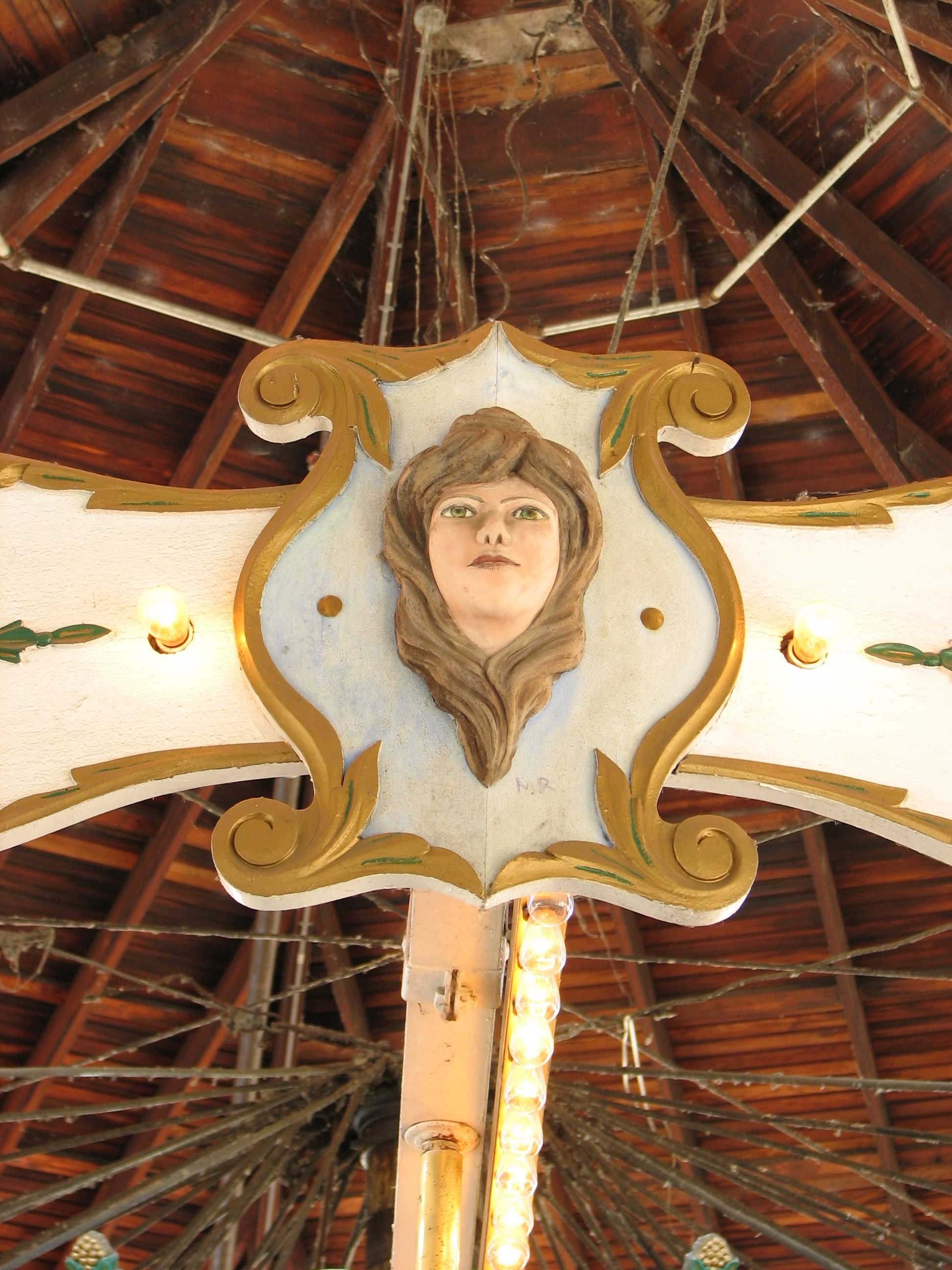
Hand-carved wooden detail on the Herschell-Spillman Noah's Ark Carousel

Name	Manufacturer	Year opened	Description
AtmosFear	Zamperla	2021	A swinging pendulum ride
Big Pink	Slides Of America Inc.	2000	A giant slide, now has 3 colors: pink, yellow and blue
Ferris Wheel	Eli Bride Co.	1966	A Ferris Wheel ride
Frog Hopper	S&S Worldwide	1999	A Bouncing Frog-themed ride
Go Karts	J&J	1999	A Go-karts ride
Herschell–Spillman Noah's Ark Carousel	Herschell/Spillman	1912	A classic carousel ride
Rock 'n Roll	Bertazzon	1996	A rock 'n' roll themed Matterhorn, with cars shaped like '57 Chevys, similar to the Alpine Bobs
Scrambler	Eli Bridge Company	1990	A classic scrambler ride
Tilt-A-Whirl	Larson International	2007	A traditional tilt-a-whirl ride

=== North End ===
Name	Manufacturer	Year opened	Description
Chipper's Choppers	Battech Enterprises	2014	A kiddie motorcycles ride
Cosmic Crash (originally called Skooter Cars)	Preston & Barbieri	2000 (as Skooter Cars) 2013 (as Cosmic Crash)	A space themed Bumper Car attraction
Jump Boats	Zamperla	2016	A Jump Around ride
Rockin' Tug	Zamperla	2003	A Rockin' Tug ride
Sky Fighters	Unknown	1960s	A Spaceship Simulator ride
Toon Cars	Unknown	2000s	A Kiddie Cars ride
Tree Top Drop	Moser	2016	A tame drop tower ride meant for families
Up Up and Away	Zamperla	2006	A spinning balloon tower ride

- Chipper's Woods Miniature Golf (new for 2011)

=== Roller skating rink ===
The park includes a 100 by 200 feet (30 m × 61 m) wooden roller skating rink, open year-round. The rink has had a pipe organ for most of its history; since 1955 it has been a Wurlitzer model with four manuals, moved to the rink from its previous home at Portland's Broadway Theatre, where it had been installed in 1926. All pipework for the organ is mounted on a platform hanging over the skate floor.

=== Former rides ===
- The Zip, one of Harry Traver's famous Giant Cyclone Safety Coasters, operated at Oaks Park from 1927 to 1934.
- Scenic Railway, a wooden roller coaster that closed in 1935.
- Mad Mouse, a wild mouse roller coaster that operated from 1960 to 1976.
- Monster Mouse, a wild mouse roller coaster that operated from 1977 to 1995.
- Looping Thunder (steel looping roller coaster manufactured by Pinfari). Looping Thunder closed in 2017 to make way for a new Gerstlauer Euro-Fighter Roller coaster.
- The Haunted Mine, a dark spook-house ride opened in c. 1970s and was replaced in 2003 by 'Lewis and Clark: The Big Adventure', which closed in 2013 and was replaced by Merry Mix-Up Play Area.
- Screamin' Eagle (a KMG Fireball) which opened in 2001 and was closed in 2017 replaced by AtmosFear.
- Tubs of Fun

== Reception ==
Oaks Amusement Park placed second in the Best Place for Family Fun category of Willamette Week's annual 'Best of Portland' readers' poll in 2025. The park was a finalist in the same category in 2026.

== See also ==
- Jantzen Beach Amusement Park
- Lotus Isle
- ScareGrounds PDX, annual haunted attraction at the park
- Springwater Corridor, the former rail line that served the park, now a rail trail
- List of incidents at independent amusement parks
