= Raven's Manor =

Cocktail lounge in Portland, Oregon, U.S.

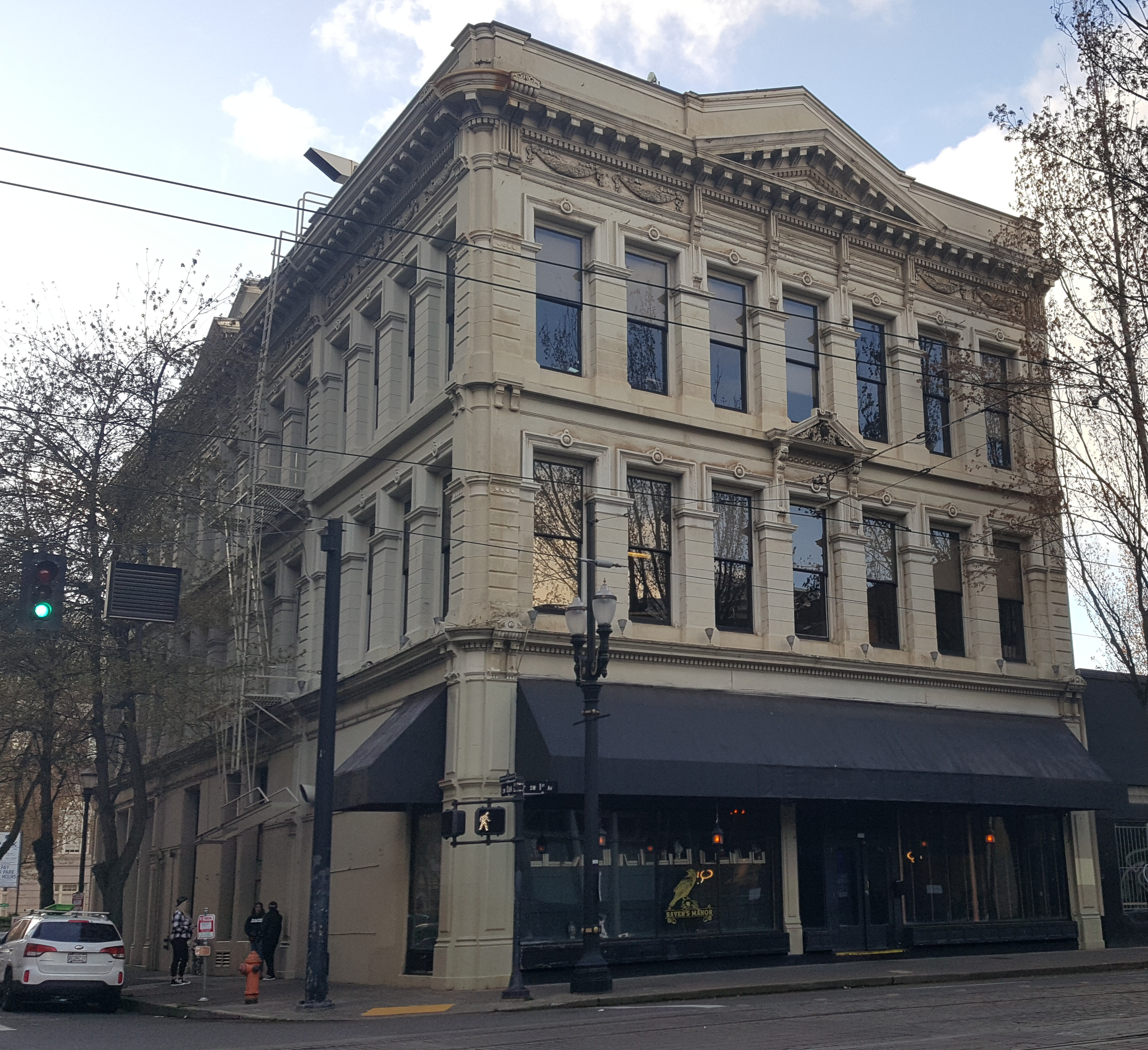
- The bar's exterior, 2022
- Interactive map of Raven's Manor

Restaurant information
- Established: May 14, 2021
- Owners: Jared Bradley; Rebecca Vega
- Location: 235 Southwest 1st Avenue, Portland, Multnomah, Oregon, 97204, United States
- Coordinates: 45.5206°N 122.6722°W
- Website: ravensmanorexperience.com

Raven's Manor is a cocktail lounge in Portland, Oregon. Inspired by haunted houses, the bar was founded by Jared Bradley and Rebecca Vega in 2021 and has been compared to Disneyland's Haunted Mansion.

== Description ==
The cocktail lounge is located at 1st Avenue and Oak Street in southwest Portland, in the Henry Failing Building space previously occupied by No Vacancy Lounge. The "elixir experience" in which guests create cocktails features characters, including Dr. Raven, "a 19th-century physician who kidnapped and experimented on his party guests in a quest for immortality", and his assistant Dr. Creeps.

The menu has included a Grilled Cheese of Darkness and a vegan meatloaf shaped like a brain, called Cerebral Matter. The drink menu has included absinthe and the Hellfire (Grand Marnier set aflame and mixed with bourbon and bitters). Drinks are poured from skulls and served in beakers. Chilled Brains on the dessert menu has Tillamook ice cream with brownie and chocolate sauce.

== History ==
The bar opened on May 14, 2021. Upon opening, Raven's Manor offered 15 signature cocktails.

== Reception ==
Willamette Week said, "Creatures of the night, be forewarned: Portland’s newest goth bar isn't all that goth. Sure, there are spooky sights in view as soon as you enter Raven's Manor, from creepy dolls to dusty grimoires. But don't go expecting the westside version of the Lovecraft. Instead, think Disneyland's Haunted Mansion. Important note: The Grave Water is hands down the best drink. Its rose water, though fragrant, is perfectly balanced with elderflower liqueur and vodka."
