= Clinton Street Theater =

Theater in Portland, Oregon, U.S.

Coordinates: 45°30′12″N 122°38′24″W

- The Clinton (1915–1945), 26th Avenue Theatre (1945–1969), Encore (1969–1975)
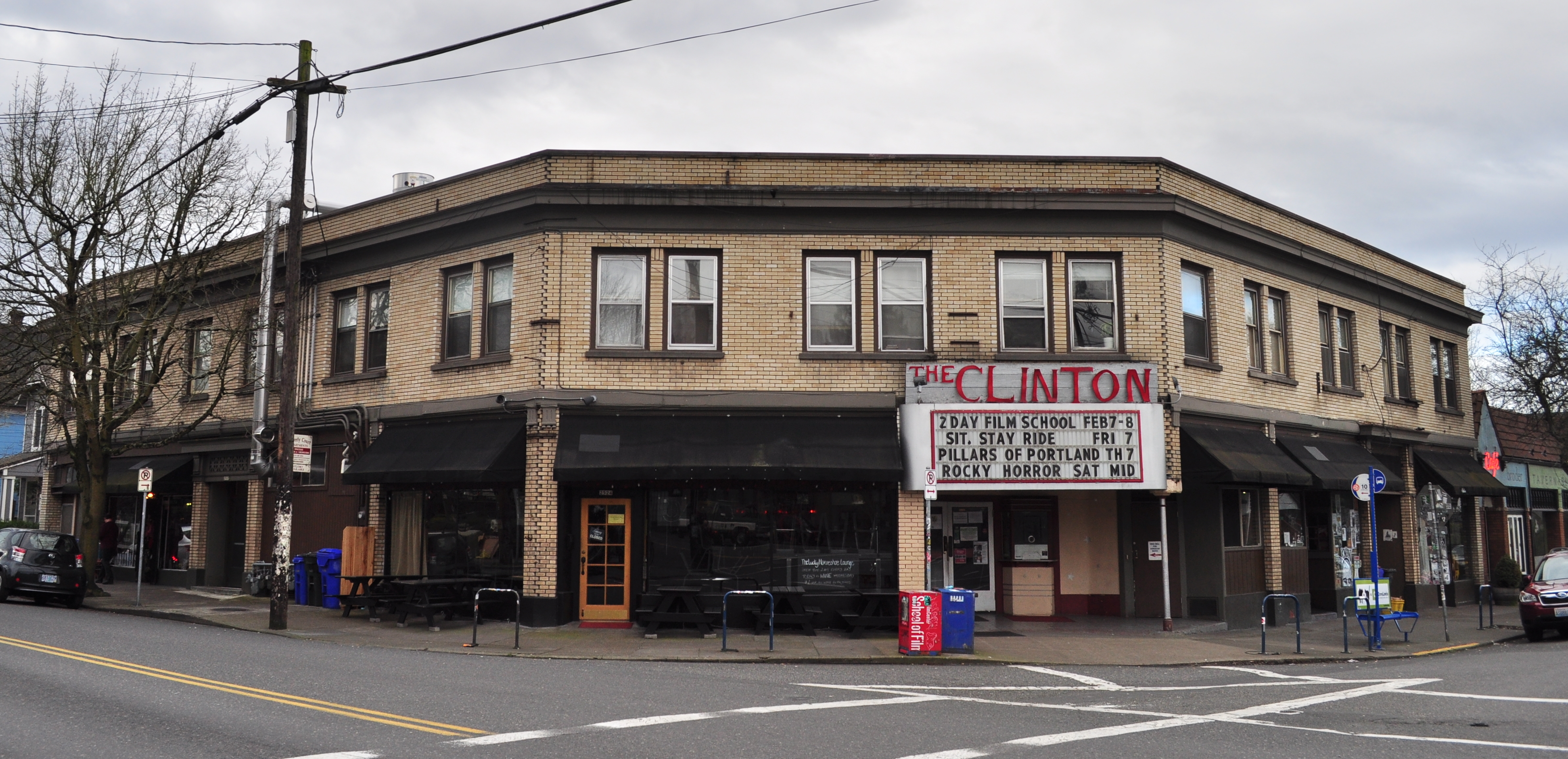
- The theater's exterior in January 2015

- Location in Central Portland
- Address: 2522 Southeast Clinton Street; Portland, Oregon; United States
- Capacity: 200

Construction
- Opened: 1915
- Years active: 1915 – present
- Architect: Charles A. Duke

Website
- cstpdx.com

The Clinton Street Theater is a theater located in southeast Portland, Oregon, United States. It is believed to be the second oldest operating movie house in the city and one of the oldest continually operating cinemas in the United States. The theater was designed by Charles A. Duke in 1913, built in 1914, and opened as The Clinton in 1915. It became known as the 26th Avenue Theatre in 1945 and the Encore in 1969, before reverting to a resemblance of its original name in 1976. The Clinton often screens exploitation, cult and experimental films, and has become known for hosting regular screenings of The Rocky Horror Picture Show (since 1978, marking one of the film's longest-running showings) and Repo! The Genetic Opera. The venue also hosts the annual Filmed by Bike festival, the Faux Film Festival and the Portland Queer Documentary Film Festival.

== History ==
A photograph of the building that was to house the theater appeared in The Morning Oregonian newspaper in 1913. Known as the Kleist Building after its owner, Edward Kleist, it had a pressed brick front and walls with hollow tiles. The second floor was intended for residential rooms and apartments, and the ground floor was designed for business storerooms and a movie theater. According to a February 1915 newspaper advertisement, The Exploits of Elaine, the first in a continuing series of Craig Kennedy detective stories, was to show at The Clinton on March 1.

The 300-seat theater was designed by Charles A. Duke in 1913 and opened in 1915 as The Clinton. Its main entrance faced 26th Avenue until 1922. The venue became known as the 26th Avenue Theatre in 1945 and the Encore in 1969, before reverting to a variation of its original name on May 30, 1975. At that time, a five-person collective bought the theater. The collective consisted of Jim Blashfield, Joe Uris, Lenny Diener, David Lifton and others. The group also published the Clinton St. Quarterly, with poetry by Walt Curtis and cartoons by John Callahan. The movie house had been showing X-rated films, which the collective replaced with a wide variety of movies including foreign films, The Rocky Horror Picture Show, and older films like The African Queen.

In September 1999, Elizabeth Rozier and Dennis Nyback took over operation of the theater. Nyback had previously shown films at the Clinton beginning in 1997. He was told about the availability of the theater when he was showing films in June 1999. During his time operating the theater with Rozier, Clinton showed a mix of new films, revival films, and creations by Nyback using his archive. His shows included: "Defining the 1970's Through Classic Commercials", "Bad Bugs Bunny", "Strange and Surreal Industrial Films", "F&#k Mickey Mouse", "Scopitone A Go Go", "Jazz on Film", "The Dark Side of Dr. Seuss", "Forty Years of Classic Commercials", and "The Genius of Bob Clampett".

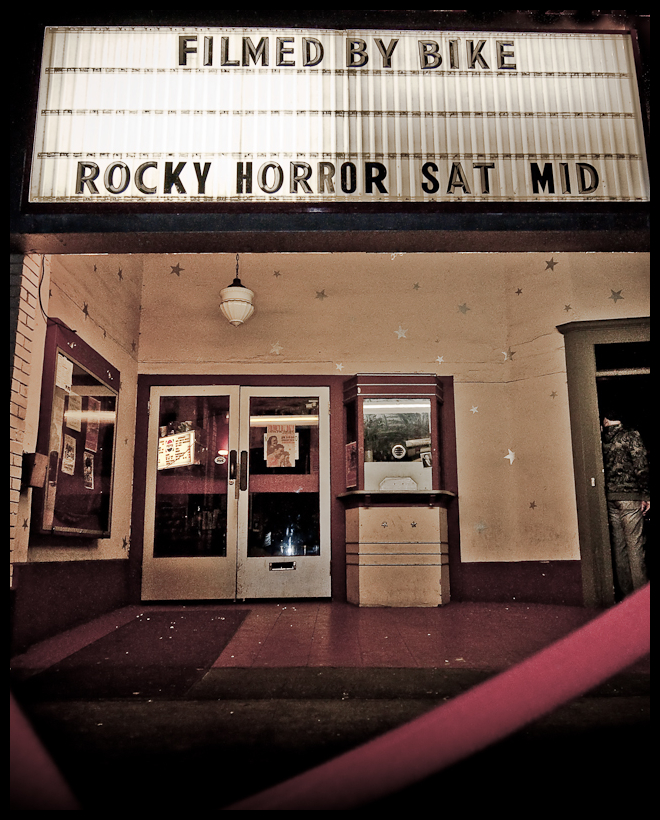
The theater in 2010

Seth and Nicola Sonstein purchased the business from Elizabeth Rozier in September 2003. The couple "fell in love with both the city and the theater" after visiting in July 2002 as coordinators of San Francisco's Sick Puppy short film festival. The Sonsteins added heating and air conditioning, both firsts for the theater, and refurbished the bathrooms, lobby and walls, among other upgrades. Screening independent films and supporting local filmmakers remain the couple's primary goals.

In March 2012 the business, including fixtures and projection and concession equipment, but not the building itself, were listed for sale. In April 2012 ownership of the business transferred from the Sonsteins to Roger and Lani Jo Leigh. After the sale, Seth Sonstein said in a press release: "For the last eight-and-a-half years I have had the opportunity to run the coolest movie theater, in the coolest neighborhood, in the coolest city in America. My eternal gratitude goes out to the citizens of Portland. I can never say thank you enough times for all of the support you have given to the Clinton." Events to mark the change included an open house "meet-and-greet", which included screenings of two documentary films by Lani Jo, and an evening of rare trailers and video clips from the Prelinger Archives. Lani Jo confirmed the theater will continue to offer screenings of The Rocky Horror Picture Show and focus on documentary and independent films.

In April 2022, ownership was transferred from the Leighs to a collective of six co-owners, who plan to continue the weekly screening of Rocky Horror.

== Events ==
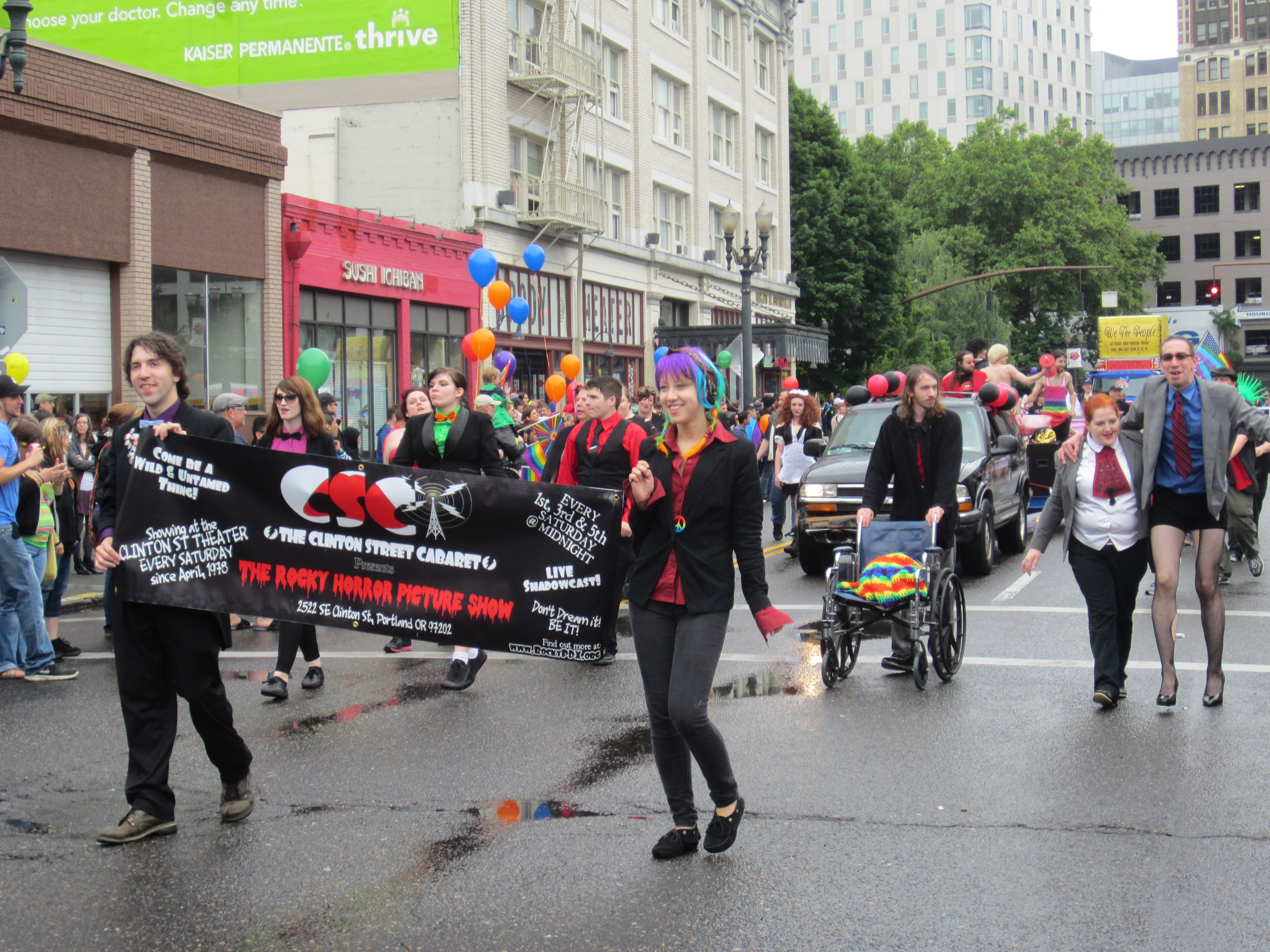
Members of the Clinton Street Cabaret, who present The Rocky Horror Picture Show, walking in Portland's Pride Parade in 2014

Clinton Street Theater offers: "a mixture of grindhouse, music films, political documentaries and experimental films". The theater has become known for its weekly screenings of Rocky Horror and Repo! The Genetic Opera, and for its annual Filmed by Bike festival, which began in 2003 and features: "bike-themed independent short movies from around the world." Rocky Horror screenings began in 1978, marking one of the longest-running showings of the film. The theater also hosts the Faux Film Festival, offering cult and independent film showings, and the Portland Queer Documentary Film Festival.

To celebrate the 40th anniversary of the Portland Trail Blazers, in 2009 the theater screened the 1978 rare and out of circulation documentary Fast Break about the team's 1976–77 championship season. In 2010 the Clinton hosted the Three-Minute Picture Show, which featured screenings of three-minute films by first-time filmmakers. The venue has also hosted benefit events, such as "Can't Stop the Serenity" (presented by PDX Browncoats), which included showings of the film Serenity among other features to benefit Equality Now and the Oregon Food Bank. Other hosted events have included the Portland Underground Film Festival, comedy shows, commemorations for holidays such as Martin Luther King Jr. Day, and lectures on film making.

Many celebrities have appeared at the theater to promote films, including Crispin Glover in 2008, and Bill Plympton and Tom Shadyac in 2011. Chuck Palahniuk, Tom Potter and Gus Van Sant have also appeared at the theater.

== See also ==
- GuignolFest
- History of film
- Midnight movie
- Neptune Theatre (Seattle), also known for screening The Rocky Horror Picture Show
- The Rocky Horror Picture Show cult following
