= ScareGrounds PDX =

Annual haunted attraction in Portland, Oregon, U.S.

- Logo

- Entrance to the haunted attraction, 2026
- Status: Active
- Frequency: Annually
- Venue: Oaks Amusement Park
- Location: Portland, Oregon
- Country: United States
- Website: scaregroundspdx.com

ScareGrounds PDX is an annual haunted attraction in Portland, Oregon, United States. The Portland Mercury has described ScareGrounds as "Oregon's largest and most terrifying haunted attraction". The event takes place at Oaks Amusement Park in southeast Portland, Oregon's Sellwood-Moreland neighborhood.

== History ==
Grimthorne's Revenge, 2026

In 2020, during the COVID-19 pandemic, Oaks Amusement Park hosted a haunted house attraction for the first time since 2006. The attraction billed as the "Oaks Park Haunted Drive-Thru" took place in detached car garages. Willamette Week described the attraction as "a series of three-act mini-plays", with actors lip-syncing to prerecorded dialogue. Among the five "theatrical experiences" was "The Condemned", which had a storyline with local children getting kidnapped by "a family of cannibalistic country folk". The newspaper's Matthew Singer said the frights were "much entirely derived from the performers menacing you from outside the car then suddenly thwacking amputated foam body parts against the windshield". According to The Wall Street Journal, the 18-minute-long drive-through attraction covered 44 acres and was attended by an average of 300 cars per night, with guests waiting approximately 20–40 minutes to enter. There were approximately 35 actors with masks and prosthetics.

Hangman's Crossing (2026)

In 2021, ScareGrounds PDX and the park partnered to create Oaks Park ScareGrounds, which had three haunted houses in addition to roller skating, trick-or-treating, and the standard carnival rides. To comply with guidelines during the pandemic, guests and staff had to wear face masks. Staff were also required to be vaccinated. The three themed attractions were called "Graveyard Pumpkin Patch", "House of Horrors Scarezone", and "Last 'Scream' Photo Op".

The three haunted houses in 2022 had new themes: the dilapidated mansion "Grimthorne Manor", the museum of nightmares resembling a medical laboratory called "The Complex", and "The Silver Screen", described as a 1980s "slasher movie palace experience". In addition to activities like coffin rides, miniature golf, photo booths, and roller skating, there was a fireworks display on October 31, the attraction's final evening. The 2023 event was operated by Vendetta Productions. The themes for the haunted houses were "Silver Scream", which focused on monsters and villains in horror films, the vampire- and werewolf-focused "Slayers", and "The Complex", which had "mutant experiments".

There were three haunted houses again in 2024. The "Silver Scream" and "Slayers" themes returned, along with " Forbidden Fortress", which had a "cursed king and his court". The haunted houses were updated in 2025. Portland Monthly described "Slayers" as "a bloodsport arena" and there was also "a film set haunted by the undead" and "a ghoulish royal court complete with torch-lit catacombs". Other activities included "zombie archery". There were three mid-sized haunted attractions in 2026: a castle, an area with evil clowns, and a maze with characters from horror films. There were also escape rooms, food carts, games, and tarot card readings.

Actors have portrayed Beetlejuice, evil clowns, and prison wardens.

== Reception ==
Hellevator Survival, 2026

ScareGrounds PDX has been deemed "iconic" (platinum status) by the Haunted Attraction Association. Matthew Singer of Willamette Week wrote about drive-through attraction in 2020: "The effort and production value are there, but 80 freaking dollars is a steep bar for any haunted house to clear. The first act plays out on a video screen, meaning there are only two segments with live actors, and the whole thing ends abruptly after about 25 minutes. It's fun, but unless eight of your most stoned friends are willing to cram into mom's minivan and split the cost, it's hard to imagine driving off satisfied given the price." In 2026, Joe Streckert of the Portland Mercury said ScareGrounds had "enough scary clowns, the occasional contortionist zombie, and trolling actors crawling the midway to make you believe it's been infested with the powers of evil". Streckert opined, "How scary is it? Pretty darn scary. Jump scares come at you from multiple, surprising points; the scare actors did a splendid job of faking us out. One group of witches made good use of an environmental effect ... and cackled at us evilly after we collectively yelped."

== See also ==
- Culture of Portland, Oregon
- List of haunted attractions
