= Fear PDX =

Annual haunted attraction in Portland, Oregon, U.S.

- Logo

- Entrance to the attraction, 2026
- Status: Active
- Frequency: Annually
- Locations: 12219 Northeast Glisan Street, Portland, Oregon
- Coordinates: 45.5281°N 122.5365°W
- Country: United States
- Years active: 14–15
- Inaugurated: 2011
- Founder: Brian Mudgett
- Website: fearpdx.com

The Fear PDX Haunted House Screampark, also known as simply Fear PDX, The Fear PDX, and "The Fear", is an annual haunted attraction in Portland, Oregon, United States. The event originated in Vancouver, Washington in 2011, and was known as Confront Your Fears, until 2014.

Fear PDX relocated to Portland in 2015. It primarily focuses on the Halloween season, but has also hosted activities for Valentine's Day in February and Christmas in December, with vampire and Krampus-themed attractions, respectively.

== Description ==
Fear PDX is an annual haunted attraction in Portland, Oregon, operating during the Halloween season. Located in the Menlo Park Plaza shopping center in the northeast Portland part of the Hazelwood neighborhood, the attraction bills itself as "Portland's scariest haunted house" and the city's largest Halloween event. According to Portland Monthly, Fear PDX targets "more hardcore haunt-seekers" and "organizers warn those with heart conditions or high blood pressure". It has been described as the city's largest Halloween festival. Attractions feature actors and animatronics, and participants are allowed to wear costumes.

== History ==
Brian Mudgett is the creator of Fear PDX. The event originated in Vancouver, Washington, where Mudgett owned Fear PDX with his father Mike.

=== 2010s ===
The first four Halloween events were held at Vancouver Plaza. The original haunted house in 2011 was called "Mayan Apocalypse". The 2012 and 2013 events had three and four haunted houses, respectively. The two new attractions in 2012 were called "Circus Insane 3D" and "Morbid Nightmares". In 2014, the event's name was changed from Confront Your Fears to The Fear PDX. It had three haunted attractions: a voodoo temple-themed maze ("The Cursed"), the zombie apocalypse-themed "The Outbreak", and "The Slaughter", which had a family of cannibals.

The event relocated to Portland in 2015. The "Fear PDX Haunted House Screampark" had five attractions: "Blood Moon", "Factory of the Undead", "Festival of Freaks", "The Condemned", and "The Harvest". In 2016, the experience had five haunted houses with approximately 100 monsters, as well as special effects, lights, props, and sounds. The haunted houses were called "Carnage", "Factory of the Undead", "The Condemned", "The Cursed", and "The Harvest". The 2017 event was called "Fear PDX Haunted House Scream Park". It had a lot with food trucks and actors portraying "chainsaw-wielding maniacs". The six haunted attractions were called "Carnage", "The Condemned", "The Decayed", "The Harvest", "The Pit", and "The Slaughter". Fear PDX moved to a new location and had four attractions in 2018. For Valentine's Day in 2019, Fear PDX hosted "Love Bites", described as a Valentine's-themed haunted house with vampires. The five attractions in October 2019 were an apocalyptic city ("Dead City"), a carnival ("Dark Carnival"), "The Doll Factory", "The Mansion", and the new "Nightmares Extreme Haunt".

=== 2020s ===
Exterior of Fear PDX in 2026

Fear PDX hosted the haunted house "Love Bites" again in February 2020. In October, following the arrival of the COVID-19 pandemic, Fear PDX operated at 30 percent of their normal attendance to follow social distancing requirements. The event also relied more heavily on animatronics than actors. The swamp-themed area had a fog machine, green lasers, and a robotic clown that dropped from a ceiling. There were five attractions in 2021: an abandoned factory ("Factory 13"), a haunted hotel ("Kill Floor"), the evil clown-themed "Blood House", the "Layers of Darkness", and the "Midway of Fear", which had food and drink options, a gift shop, and opportunities to take photographs. Face masks and temperature checks were required for all guests and staff to comply with guidelines during the pandemic. For social distancing purposes, guests were timed to experience attractions in private groups via a ticketing system.

Among the eight attractions in 2022 were the "Midway of Fear", "Radioactive Rampage", and "The Harvest". There were eleven attractions in 2023, including "Don't Split Up", an escape room, "Smiley's Fun House", the farm-themed "The Harvest", and "The Mansion". According to The Oregonian, Fear PDX used the following disclaimer in 2024: "For your safety, you should be in good health and free from high blood pressure, heart, back or neck problems, extreme phobias, or any other medical or physical conditions that could be aggravated by a high thrill adventure."

The 2025 event had five attractions, including an asylum-themed attraction called "Tormented", escape rooms, a funhouse with clowns, a mansion, and a pumpkin farm filled with "toxic waste". Fear PDX also hosted a Krampus-themed attraction called "Krampus Holiday Haunted House" in December 2025. The 2026 event has thirteen attractions, including the new "mini-haunt" called "The Oni".

== Reception ==
Fear PDX has been deemed "iconic" (platinum status) by the Haunted Attraction Association. In 2017, Lyndsey Hewitt of the Hillsboro News Times said the event "doesn't disappoint" and wrote, "You're immediately subjected to near-torturous levels of scare tactics, while everything is seemingly going 1,000 mph. Add smoke, strobe lights, and blasting metal and dubstep music, and you're suddenly in a twisted, industrial-rave-themed horror nightmare." Delaney Rea included Fear PDX in the Daily Emerald's 2017 list of Oregon's top ten haunted houses, writing, "these attractions are definitely nailing the more hardcore-scare vibe, if that's the kind of spook you're dying for". KOIN ranked Fear PDX second in a 2023 list of the Portland metropolitan area's top haunted houses, according to Yelp. In 2026, the magazine PDX Parent recommended Feat PDX for "teens who consider screaming part of the fun".

== See also ==
- Christmas in Portland, Oregon
- Culture of Portland, Oregon
- List of festivals in the United States
- List of haunted attractions
- Valentine's Day in Portland, Oregon
