= White Owl Social Club =

Bar and restaurant in Portland, Oregon, U.S.

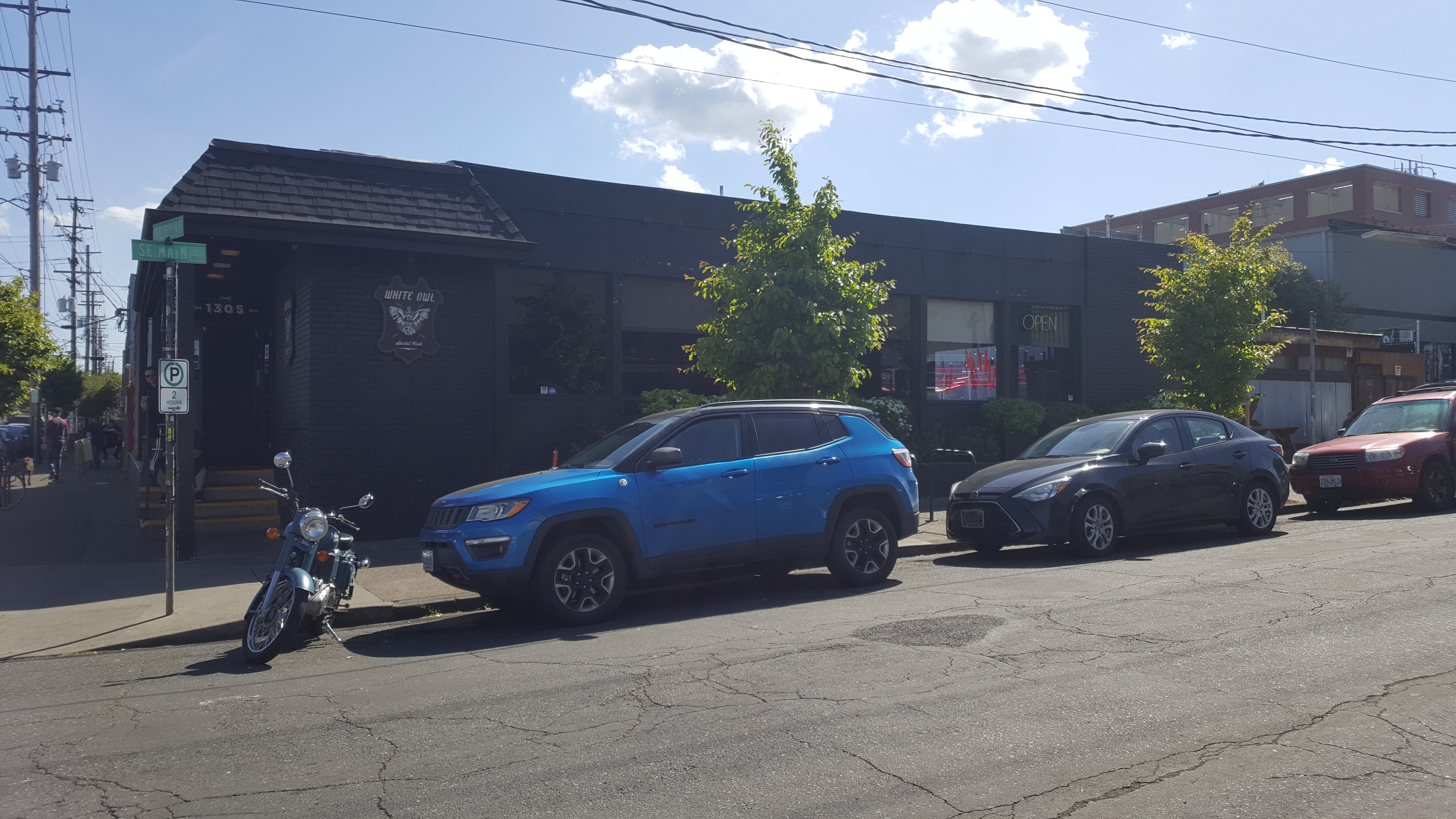
- The venue's exterior, 2019
- Interactive map of White Owl Social Club

Restaurant information
- Established: January 2013
- Owners: AJ Fosik; Jason Radich; Matthew Relkin
- Previous owners: Matthew Jacobson; Michael McKennedy
- Location: 1305 Southeast 8th Avenue, Portland, Multnomah, Oregon, 97214, United States
- Coordinates: 45.51348°N 122.65797°W
- Website: whiteowlsocialclub.com

White Owl Social Club is a bar, event space and vegan friendly restaurant in southeast Portland, Oregon's Buckman neighborhood, in the United States.

== History ==
White Owl was established in January 2013. Ownership changed from Matthew Jacobson and Michael McKennedy (who also own Sizzle Pie) to AJ Fosik, Jason Radich, and Matthew Relkin in September 2015.

In 2016, White Owl was the most frequent Lyft bar destination in Portland. In 2018, the business permanently removed beef and lamb from its menu for environmental purposes.

In 2019, the bar apologized and fired two security guards for removing a transgender guest. During this incident, security guards employed by White Owl Social Club removed a transgender woman out of the restroom by force.

== Reception ==
White Owl Social Club won in the "Best Patio" category of Willamette Week's "Best of Portland" readers' poll in 2015 and 2018. The business was a runner-up in the same category in 2020 and placed second in the Best Happy Hour category in 2026.
