= Sade discography =

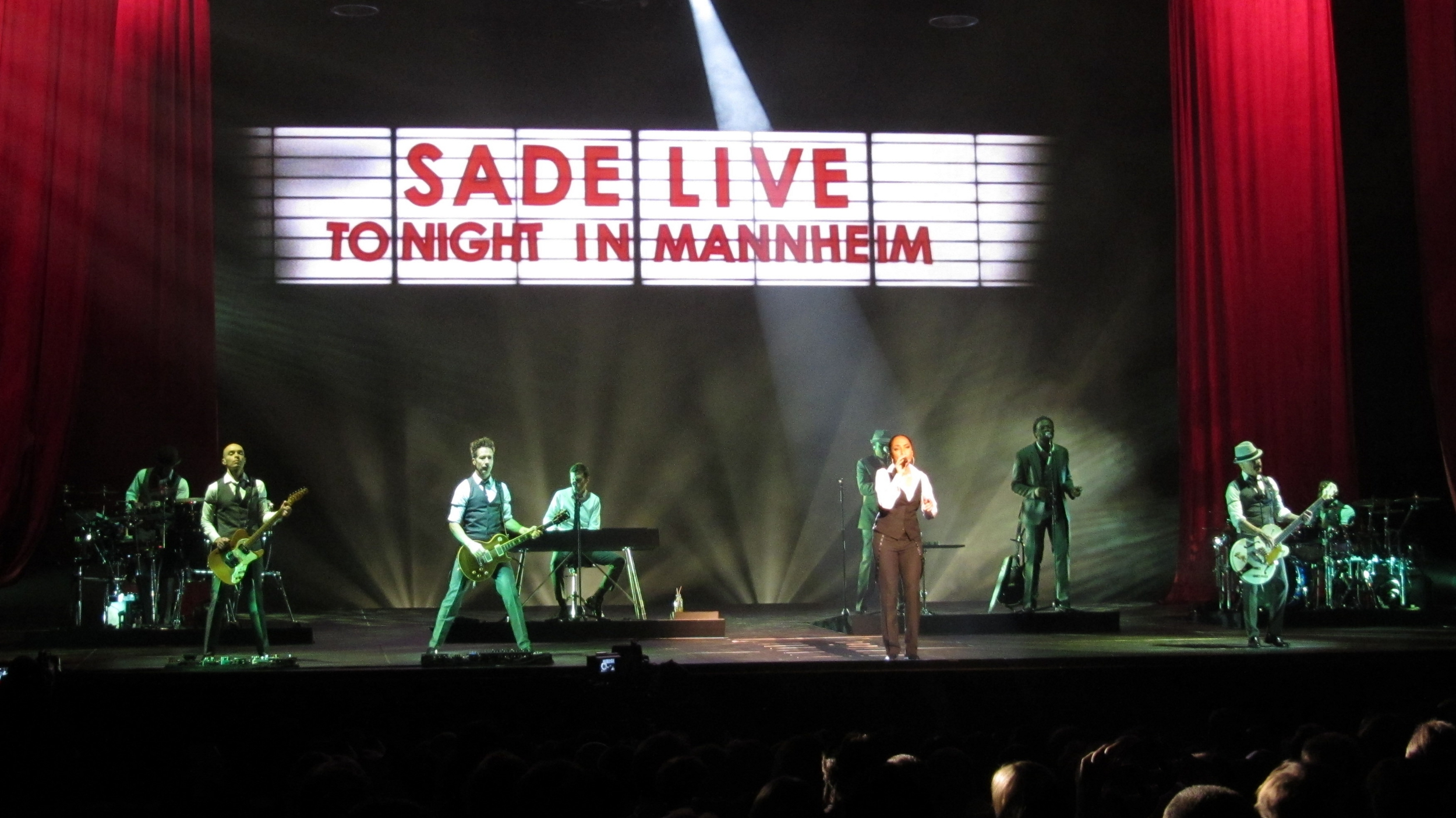
- Sade performing during Sade Live in Mannheim, Germany, in November 2011
- Studio albums: 6
- Extended plays: 2
- Live albums: 1
- Compilation albums: 2
- Singles: 26
- Video albums: 6
- Music videos: 21

English band Sade have released six studio albums, one live album, two compilation albums, two extended plays, 26 singles, six video albums, 21 music videos, and have achieved four top 20 singles on the main chart of both the US and the UK.

Following a brief stint of studying fashion design and modelling, Sade Adu began singing back up for a band named Pride. Later, she and some members left Pride and formed the band Sade in 1982. The name Sade represents the entire group, not just the singer herself. Following a record deal, Sade's debut album Diamond Life (1984) was released. At the time of release in 1984, the album sold over four million copies globally, and currently stands at ten million copies globally.

Following the release of their debut album, Sade went on to release a string of multi-platinum-selling albums. Their follow-up, Promise, was released in 1985 and peaked at number one on the US Billboard 200 chart and the UK Albums Chart, and went two times platinum in the US at the time of its release, and now stands at four times platinum. Singer Sade would later go on to make her acting debut in the film Absolute Beginners, before the release of the band's next album, Stronger Than Pride (1988). Subsequent albums included Love Deluxe (1992) and Lovers Rock (2000), all of which went multi-platinum in the US. After the release of Lovers Rock the band embarked on what would be a 10-year hiatus. The band later reunited and released their sixth album, Soldier of Love (2010), which has been certified platinum in the US and won a Grammy Award.

== Albums ==
=== Studio albums ===
List of studio albums, with selected chart positions and certifications
Title	Details	Peak chart positions										Certifications
Title	Details	UK	AUS	AUT	CAN	FRA	GER	NLD	SWE	SWI	US	Certifications
Diamond Life	Released: 16 July 1984; Label: Epic; Formats: CD, LP, cassette	2	6	1	7	1	1	1	18	1	5	BPI: 4× Platinum; ARIA: 4× Platinum; BVMI: Platinum; MC: 2× Platinum; NVPI: Platinum; RIAA: 4× Platinum; SNEP: 2× Platinum
Promise	Released: 4 November 1985; Label: Epic; Formats: CD, LP, cassette	1	9	6	3	3	2	1	4	1	1	BPI: 2× Platinum; ARIA: Platinum; BVMI: Platinum; MC: 2× Platinum; RIAA: 4× Platinum; SNEP: 2× Platinum
Stronger Than Pride	Released: 3 May 1988; Label: Epic; Formats: CD, LP, cassette	3	11	6	9	4	4	1	2	2	7	BPI: Platinum; BVMI: Gold; IFPI SWI: Platinum; MC: Platinum; NVPI: Platinum; RIAA: 3× Platinum; SNEP: 2× Platinum
Love Deluxe	Released: 26 October 1992; Label: Epic; Formats: CD, LP, cassette	10	13	11	16	1	14	10	7	6	3	BPI: Gold; ARIA: Platinum; BVMI: Gold; GLF: Gold; IFPI SWI: Gold; MC: Platinum; NVPI: Gold; RIAA: 4× Platinum; SNEP: Platinum
Lovers Rock	Released: 13 November 2000; Label: Epic; Formats: CD, LP, cassette	18	28	5	13	4	4	20	2	6	3	BPI: Platinum; ARIA: Gold; BVMI: Platinum; GLF: Platinum; IFPI AUT: Gold; IFPI SWI: Gold; MC: 2× Platinum; NVPI: Gold; RIAA: 3× Platinum; SNEP: 2× Gold
Soldier of Love	Released: 5 February 2010; Label: Epic; Formats: CD, LP, digital download	4	4	2	1	1	2	2	1	1	1	BPI: Gold; BVMI: Gold; GLF: Gold; IFPI AUT: Gold; IFPI SWI: Platinum; MC: Platinum; RIAA: Platinum; SNEP: 2× Platinum

=== Live albums ===
List of live albums, with selected chart positions and certifications
Title	Details	Peak chart positions										Certifications
Title	Details	UK	AUT	CAN	FRA	GER	NLD	SWE	SWI	US	US R&B	Certifications
Lovers Live	Released: 5 February 2002; Label: Epic; Format: CD	51	40	56	36	41	43	50	27	10	5	BVMI: Gold; RIAA: Gold

=== Compilation albums ===
List of compilation albums, with selected chart positions and certifications
Title	Details	Peak chart positions										Certifications
Title	Details	UK	AUS	AUT	CAN	FRA	GER	NLD	SWE	SWI	US	Certifications
The Best of Sade	Released: 31 October 1994; Label: Epic; Formats: CD, LP, cassette	6	23	9	22	140	15	21	7	11	9	BPI: 2× Platinum; ARIA: 3× Platinum; BVMI: Gold; IFPI AUT: Gold; MC: Platinum; NVPI: Platinum; RIAA: 4× Platinum; SNEP: 2× Gold
The Ultimate Collection	Released: 29 April 2011; Label: Epic; Formats: CD, CD+DVD, LP, digital download	8	35	22	32	23	17	12	6	11	7	BPI: Gold

== Extended plays ==
Title	Details
Solid Gold: Sade	Released: 1989; Label: Epic; Format: CD
The Remix Deluxe	Released: 21 March 1993 (Japan only); Label: Epic; Format: CD

== Singles ==
List of singles, with selected chart positions, showing year released and album name
Title	Year	Peak chart positions										Certifications	Album
Title	Year	UK	AUS	FRA	GER	IRE	NLD	NZ	US	US R&B	US AC	Certifications	Album
"Your Love Is King"	1984	6	64	—	—	7	—	2	54	35	8	BPI: Gold; BVMI: Gold; RMNZ: Platinum	Diamond Life
"When Am I Going to Make a Living"	1984	36	—	—	—	28	12	—	—	—			Diamond Life
"Smooth Operator"	1984	19	20	9	11	17	19	22	5	5	1	BPI: Platinum; BVMI: Gold; RMNZ: 2× Platinum	Diamond Life
"Hang On to Your Love"	1984	—	68	—	—	—	28	20	— (Note: "Hang On to Your Love" did not enter the Billboard Hot 100, but peaked at number 2 on the Bubbling Under Hot 100 Singles chart.)	14	—		Diamond Life
"The Sweetest Taboo"	1985	31	65	30	28	11	14	11	5	3	1	BPI: Silver; RMNZ: 2× Platinum	Promise
"Is It a Crime?"	1985	49	—	46	57	21	32	—	—	55	32		Promise
"Never as Good as the First Time"	1986	89	70	—	65	29	35	31	20	8	6		Promise
"Love Is Stronger Than Pride"	1988	44	56	36	51	28	18	—	—	—	—		Stronger Than Pride
"Paradise"	1988	29	86	38	—	—	26	—	16	1	3		Stronger Than Pride
"Nothing Can Come Between Us"	1988	92	—	—	—	—	89	—	—	3	21		Stronger Than Pride
"Turn My Back on You"	1988	101	—	—	—	—	—	—	—	12	—		Stronger Than Pride
"Haunt Me"	1989	—	—	—	—	—	—	—	—	—	—		Stronger Than Pride
"No Ordinary Love"	1992	14 (Note: "No Ordinary Love" originally reached number 26 on the UK Singles Chart in October 1992. It reached a new peak of number 14 when re-released in June 1993.)	21	20	43	—	26	19	28	9	14	BPI: Silver; RMNZ: Gold	Love Deluxe
"Feel No Pain"	1992	56	107	—	80	—	—	48	—	59	—		Love Deluxe
"Kiss of Life"	1993	44	186	—	88	—	—	33	78	10	20	BPI: Silver; RMNZ: Platinum	Love Deluxe
"Cherish the Day"	1993	53	—	—	—	—	—	—	— (Note: "Cherish the Day" did not enter the Billboard Hot 100, but peaked at number 16 on the Bubbling Under Hot 100 Singles chart.)	45	—		Love Deluxe
"By Your Side"	2000	17	—	—	67	29	66	—	75	41	18	BPI: Gold; RMNZ: Platinum	Lovers Rock
"King of Sorrow"	2001	59	—	—	—	—	82	—	—	— (Note: "King of Sorrow" did not enter the Hot R&B/Hip-Hop Songs chart, but peaked at number one on the Bubbling Under R&B/Hip-Hop Singles chart.)	—		Lovers Rock
"Somebody Already Broke My Heart" (live)	2003	—	—	—	—	—	—	—	—	—	—		Lovers Live
"Soldier of Love"	2010	123	—	—	—	—	—	—	52	6	—		Soldier of Love
"Babyfather"	2010	—	—	—	—	—	—	—	—	53	—		Soldier of Love
"The Moon and the Sky"	2010	—	—	—	—	—	—	—	—	54	—		Soldier of Love
"Still in Love with You"	2011	—	—	—	—	—	—	—	—	55	—		The Ultimate Collection
"Flower of the Universe"	2018	—	—	—	—	—	—	—	—	—	—		A Wrinkle in Time: Original Motion Picture Soundtrack
"The Big Unknown"	2018	—	—	—	—	—	—	—	—	—	—		Widows
"—" denotes a recording that did not chart or was not released in that territory.

== Guest appearances ==
List of non-single guest appearances, showing year released and album name
Title	Year	Album
"Killer Blow"	1986	Absolute Beginners: The Original Motion Picture Soundtrack
"Please Send Me Someone to Love"	1994	Philadelphia: Music from the Motion Picture
"Mum"	2005	Voices for Darfur
"Young Lion"	2024	Transa

== Videography ==
=== Video albums ===
List of video albums, with selected charts certifications
Title	Details	Peak positions		Certifications
Title	Details	AUS	US	Certifications
Diamond Life Video	Released: 1985; Label: CBS Fox Video Music; Formats: VHS, LaserDisc	—	9	RIAA: Gold
Life Promise Pride Love	Released: 1993; Label: Epic; Formats: VHS, LaserDisc, DVD	—	5	RIAA: Platinum
Live	Released: 22 November 1994; Label: Epic; Formats: VHS, DVD	—	8	RIAA: 2× Platinum
Lovers Live	Released: 18 February 2002; Label: Epic; Format: DVD	16	1	RIAA: Platinum
Live in Munich 1984	Released: 2011; Label: Hudson Street; Format: DVD	—	—	
Bring Me Home: Live 2011	Released: 22 May 2012; Label: Epic; Formats: DVD+CD, Blu-ray, digital download	4	1	
"—" denotes a recording that did not chart or was not released in that territory.

=== Music videos ===
List of music videos, showing year released and directors
Title	Year	Director(s)	Ref.
"Your Love Is King"	1984	Jack Semmens	
"When Am I Going to Make a Living"	1984	Stuart Orme	
"Smooth Operator"	1984	Julien Temple	
"Hang On to Your Love"	1984	Brian Ward	
"The Sweetest Taboo"	1985	Brian Ward	
"Is It a Crime"	1986	Brian Ward	
"Never as Good as the First Time"	1986	Brian Ward	
"Love Is Stronger Than Pride"	1988	Sophie Muller	
"Paradise"	1988	Alex McDowell	
"Turn My Back on You"	1988	Sophie Muller	
"Nothing Can Come Between Us"	1989	Sophie Muller	
"No Ordinary Love"	1992	Sophie Muller	
"Feel No Pain"	1992	Albert Watson	
"Kiss of Life"	1993	Albert Watson	
"Cherish the Day"	1993	Albert Watson	
"By Your Side"	2000	Sophie Muller	
"King of Sorrow"	2001	Sophie Muller	
"Soldier of Love"	2010	Sophie Muller	
"Babyfather"	2010	Sophie Muller	
"Love Is Found"	2011	Sophie Muller	
"Young Lion"	2024	Sophie Muller	
