= Lovers Rock Tour =

2001 concert tour by Sade

- Tour by Sade
- Promotional poster
- Associated album: Lovers Rock
- Start date: 14 July 2001
- End date: 21 September 2001
- Legs: 1
- No. of shows: 42 in North America

Sade concert chronology
- Love Deluxe World Tour (1993); Lovers Rock Tour (2001); Sade Live (2011)

The Lovers Rock Tour was the fifth concert tour by English band Sade. Predominately visiting amphitheaters in North America, the tour supported the band's fifth studio album, Lovers Rock. Taking place in 2001, it was deemed by many critics as a comeback tour as it marked the band's first performances since 1994. Although many believed the trek would expand to other countries, this did not come to fruition. With over 40 shows, it became the 13th biggest tour in North America, earning over 26 million.

== Background ==
The tour was announced via Sade's website in April 2001. The announcement stated the tour would begin in the summer of 2001 with 30 shows. Initial dates were rescheduled due to extended rehearsal time. The shows sold well, with many stops adding additional shows. In August 2001, the tour was extended by eight weeks, due to ticket demand. The tour was produced by SFX Entertainment and was the band's first tour in seven years, following the Love Deluxe World Tour. The tour also marks the band's final performances until 2011's tour, Sade Live.

== Opening acts ==
- India Arie (select dates)
- Youssou N'Dour (Los Angeles—22 July)
- Phuz (select dates)

== Setlist ==
1. "Cherish the Day"
2. "Your Love Is King"
3. "Somebody Already Broke My Heart" (includes excerpt of "Never as Good as the First Time")
4. "Cherry Pie"
5. "Pearls"
6. "Every Word"
7. "Smooth Operator"
8. "Redeye"
9. "Jezebel"
10. "Kiss of Life"
11. "Slave Song"
12. "The Sweetest Gift"
13. "The Sweetest Taboo"
14. "Lovers Rock"
15. "Immigrant"
16. "Paradise"
17. "King of Sorrow"
18. "No Ordinary Love"
19. "By Your Side"

Encore

20. "Flow"
21. "Is It a Crime"
22. "It's Only Love That Gets You Through"

== Tour dates ==
Date	City	Country	Venue
14 July 2001	Vancouver	Canada	General Motors Place
15 July 2001	Seattle	United States	KeyArena
17 July 2001	Concord	United States	Chronicle Pavilion
18 July 2001	Mountain View	United States	Shoreline Amphitheatre
20 July 2001	Irvine	United States	Verizon Wireless Amphitheatre
22 July 2001	Los Angeles	United States	Hollywood Bowl
23 July 2001	Los Angeles	United States	Hollywood Bowl
26 July 2001	Chula Vista	United States	Coors Amphitheatre
27 July 2001	Las Vegas	United States	MGM Grand Garden Arena
29 July 2001	Selma	United States	Verizon Wireless Amphitheater
30 July 2001	Dallas	United States	American Airlines Center
1 August 2001	The Woodlands	United States	Cynthia Woods Mitchell Pavilion
4 August 2001	Minneapolis	United States	Target Center
5 August 2001	Rosemont	United States	Allstate Arena
7 August 2001	Rosemont	United States	Allstate Arena
8 August 2001	Toronto	Canada	Air Canada Centre
10 August 2001	Holmdel	United States	PNC Bank Arts Center
11 August 2001	Camden	United States	Tweeter Center at the Waterfront
13 August 2001	New York City	United States	Madison Square Garden
15 August 2001	New York City	United States	Madison Square Garden
16 August 2001	Wantagh	United States	Jones Beach Theater
18 August 2001	Cleveland	United States	CSU Convocation Center
19 August 2001	Auburn Hills	United States	The Palace of Auburn Hills
21 August 2001	Baltimore	United States	Baltimore Arena
22 August 2001	Boston	United States	FleetCenter
24 August 2001	Bristow	United States	Nissan Pavilion at Stone Ridge
25 August 2001	Raleigh	United States	Alltel Pavilion at Walnut Creek
27 August 2001	Atlanta	United States	Philips Arena
29 August 2001	Sunrise	United States	National Car Rental Center
30 August 2001	Tampa	United States	Ice Palace
1 September 2001	New Orleans	United States	New Orleans Arena
3 September 2001	Bonner Springs	United States	Sandstone Amphitheater
5 September 2001	St. Louis	United States	Savvis Center
7 September 2001	Noblesville	United States	Verizon Wireless Music Center
8 September 2001	Cincinnati	United States	Riverbend Music Center
10 September 2001	Columbus	United States	Polaris Amphitheater
13 September 2001	Denver	United States	Pepsi Center
15 September 2001	Las Vegas	United States	MGM Grand Garden Arena
16 September 2001	Phoenix	United States	Desert Pavilions
18 September 2001	Concord	United States	Chronicle Pavilion
20 September 2001	Anaheim	United States	Arrowhead Pond of Anaheim
21 September 2001	Inglewood	United States	Great Western Forum

Cancellations and rescheduled shows

17 July 2001	Mountain View, California	Shoreline Amphitheatre	Rescheduled to 18 July 2001
18 July 2001	Concord, California	Chronicle Pavilion	Rescheduled to 17 July 2001
21 July 2001	Las Vegas, Nevada	MGM Grand Garden Arena	Rescheduled to 27 July 2001

=== Box office box score ===
Venue	City	Tickets Sold / Available	Gross Revenue
Hollywood Bowl	Los Angeles	32,138 / 35,086 (92%)	$1,977,007
MGM Grand Garden Arena	Las Vegas	12,225 / 12,846 (95%)	$897,361
American Airlines Center	Dallas	11,840 / 13,446 (88%)	$743,730
Jones Beach Theater	Wantagh	14,063 / 14,108 (~100%)	$912,919
Baltimore Arena	Baltimore	10,349 / 11,390 (91%)	$678,192
New Orleans Arena	New Orleans	10,540 / 12,251 (86%)	$648,700
TOTAL		91,155 / 99,127 (92%)	$5,857,909

== Broadcasts and recordings ==
The concerts in Anaheim and Inglewood were chronicled for the band's first live CD/DVD recording respectively titled, Lovers Live. The live recordings were released in February 2002 and topped the charts in the United States, Belgium and Italy. The album sold over 500,000 copies in the U.S., adding a gold record to the band's repertoire.

== Critical reception ==
The tour received high praise from music critics in the U.S. and Canada. Steve Baltin (Rolling Stone) found Adu's vocal performance effortless, during the show at the KeyArena. He says, "Musically, some of the other peak moments were a stunning 'No Ordinary Love'; a moving 'By Your Side'; a buoyant 'Paradise,' and 'King of Sorrow'. After closing with 'By Your Side,' Sade and her band left to a deafening ovation. The three-song encore was highlighted by a vocally powerful 'Is It a Crime,' in which Sade let loose with great success".

Jason Reynolds (NME) writes the band left the crowd at the Hollywood Bowl "beaming". He continues, "As Sade steps out on to the stage, she instantly captures the hearts of the crowd. Still looking stunning, she exudes a magnetism that draws them into her spell. It's very simple – no choreographed dance routines, no pyrotechnics – just Sade herself. The voice". For the concert at the Verizon Wireless Amphitheater in Selma; Rauol Hernandez stated despite the heatwave in the CenTex area, Sade was the "storm" the area needed. He further states, "The thunder and lightning video was especially apropos. Sade's quiet storm really is 'The Sweetest Taboo'".

Adu's vocals were deemed smooth as silk for the concert in Rosemont. Corey Moss (MTV News) writes, "Unlike Madonna and Janet Jackson, the other pop divas on tour this summer, Sade doesn't overly decorate her tunes with costumes and choreography". Jane Stevenson (Toronto Sun) gave the performance at the Air Canada Centre 4 out of 5 stars. She explains, "What else would you expect from a singer who was the epitome of cool way back in 1984 with the release of her debut album and has barely changed her trademark laid-back, jazz-inflected R&B grooves or classic ponytail and hoop earrings look since then"?

Issac Guzman (New York Daily News) mentioned the band displayed a passion for music and their fans. He says, "When she sang the title song of last year's 'Lovers Rock' album, she was referring not so much to rock music, but to a solid foundation on which one might build a relationship. This relationship, of course, is best constructed in a vaguely exotic milieu where people rendezvous in small cafes on the French Riviera or dance on the veranda of a private villa stocked with Champagne". Jon Pareles (The New York Times) writes the band displayed various emotions throughout the show at the famous Madison Square Garden. He continues, "Sade still sang with the pauses and hesitations she learned from [Billie] Holiday, but every so often when she reached a confession of great pain or joy, she dispelled the smoke in her voice to reveal a pure, indelible ache. Even when she sang more demurely, it was clear that her composure was anything but nonchalant".

== Personnel ==
- Sade Adu – vocals
- Andrew Hale – keyboards
- Stuart Matthewman – guitar, saxophone
- Paul S. Denman – bass
- Karl Vanden Bossche – percussion
- Charlie Bouis – recording engineer
- Ian Duncan – digital editing
- Lynn Jeffrey – personal assistant
- Eric Johnston – assistant engineer
- Pete Lewinson – drums
- Tony Momrelle – vocals
- Sophie Muller – image design
- Andrew Nichols – assistant mixer
- Leroy Osbourne – flute, guitar, vocals
- Howard Page – engineer
- Mike Pela – mixing
- Ryan Waters – guitar
