= Bring Me Home: Live 2011 =

Video by Sade
- Released: 22 May 2012
- Recorded: 4 September 2011
- Venue: Citizens Business Bank Arena (Ontario, California)
- Length: 122:00
- Label: RCA
- Director: Sophie Muller

Sade video chronology
Lovers Live (2002)	Bring Me Home: Live 2011 (2012)

Bring Me Home: Live 2011 is the fifth video album and third live release by English band Sade, released on 22 May 2012 by RCA Records. It was filmed at Citizens Business Bank Arena in Ontario, California, on 4 September 2011 during the band's Sade Live concert tour. The DVD and Blu-ray contain 21 tracks, as well as rare glimpses of behind-the-stage scenes with a 20-minute documentary, exclusive candid moments, a short technical documentary by Stuart Matthewman, and outtakes from the crew. The CD that accompanies the DVD release includes 13 tracks. A deluxe bundle containing both the audio and video of the concert was released on iTunes.

Bring Me Home: Live 2011 debuted at number one on the US Top Music Videos chart. It was nominated for Best Long Form Music Video at the 2013 Grammy Awards.

== Track listing ==
DVD and Blu-ray
No.	Title	Writer(s)	Length
1.	"Soldier of Love"	Sade Adu; Andrew Hale; Stuart Matthewman; Paul S. Denman	7:53
2.	"Your Love Is King"	Adu; Matthewman	4:57
3.	"Skin"	Adu; Matthewman; Hale; Denman	3:57
4.	"Kiss of Life"	Adu; Matthewman; Hale; Denman	5:01
5.	"Love Is Found"	Adu; Hale; Matthewman; Denman	5:18
6.	"In Another Time"	Adu; Matthewman; Hale	4:30
7.	"Smooth Operator"	Adu; Ray St. John	4:30
8.	"Jezebel"	Adu; Matthewman	6:55
9.	"Bring Me Home"	Adu; Matthewman; Hale	4:11
10.	"Is It a Crime"	Adu; Matthewman; Hale	8:12
11.	"Love Is Stronger Than Pride"	Adu; Hale; Matthewman	4:37
12.	"All About Our Love"	Adu; Matthewman; Hale; Denman	2:38
13.	"Paradise"	Adu; Hale; Matthewman; Denman	3:55
14.	"Nothing Can Come Between Us"	Adu, Matthewman, Hale	2:25
15.	"Morning Bird"	Adu; Hale; Matthewman	4:35
16.	"King of Sorrow"	Adu; Matthewman; Hale; Denman	4:02
17.	"The Sweetest Taboo"	Adu; Martin Ditcham	5:07
18.	"The Moon and the Sky"	Adu; Matthewman; Hale	4:35
19.	"Pearls"	Adu; Hale	4:34
20.	"No Ordinary Love"	Adu; Matthewman	5:52
21.	"By Your Side"	Adu; Matthewman; Hale; Denman	10:17
22.	"Cherish the Day"	Adu; Hale; Matthewman	7:17
23.	"How Do You Say Thank You?" (extra)		21:01
24.	"In the Trenches" (extra)		6:22
25.	"3 Seconds" (extra)		2:45

CD
No.	Title	Writer(s)	Length
1.	"Soldier of Love"	Adu; Hale; Matthewman; Denman	6:16
2.	"Skin"	Adu; Matthewman; Hale; Denman	3:57
3.	"Kiss of Life"	Adu; Matthewman; Hale; Denman	5:04
4.	"Love Is Found"	Adu; Hale; Matthewman; Denman	4:05
5.	"In Another Time"	Adu; Matthewman; Hale	4:34
6.	"Jezebel"	Adu; Matthewman	6:57
7.	"All About Our Love"	Adu; Matthewman; Hale; Denman	2:38
8.	"Paradise/Nothing Can Come Between Us"	Adu; Hale; Matthewman; Denman	6:23
9.	"Morning Bird"	Adu; Hale; Matthewman	4:40
10.	"The Moon and the Sky"	Adu; Matthewman; Hale	4:29
11.	"No Ordinary Love"	Adu; Matthewman	5:50
12.	"By Your Side"	Adu; Matthewman; Hale; Denman	4:53
13.	"Cherish the Day"	Adu; Hale; Matthewman	7:32

== Personnel ==
Credits adapted from the liner notes of Bring Me Home: Live 2011.

=== Sade ===
- Sade Adu – vocals
- Stuart Matthewman – guitar, saxophone
- Andrew Hale – keyboards
- Paul S. Denman – bass

=== Additional musicians ===
- Leroy Osbourne – vocals, guitar
- Tony Momrelle – vocals
- Pete Lewinson – drums
- Ryan Waters – guitar
- Karl Vanden Bossche – percussion

=== Technical ===
- Sophie Muller – film direction, film production, editing
- Grant Jue – film production
- Roger Davies – film production
- Mike Pela – DVD audio mix engineering
- Mazen Murad – mastering
- Steven Chivers – director of photography
- Tom Russell – colourist
- Sade Adu – editing
- Steve Rees – editing

=== Artwork ===
- Jeri Heiden – package design

== Charts ==
=== Weekly charts ===
2012 weekly chart performance for Bring Me Home: Live 2011 (video)
Chart (2012)	Peak position
Australian Music DVD (ARIA)	4
Austrian Music DVD (Ö3 Austria)	1
Belgian Music DVD (Ultratop Flanders)	3
Belgian Music DVD (Ultratop Wallonia)	1
Czech Music DVD (ČNS IFPI)	1
Danish Music DVD (Hitlisten)	5
Dutch Music DVD (MegaCharts)	2
Finnish Music DVD (Suomen virallinen lista)	1
French Music DVD (SNEP)	1
German Music DVD (Media Control)	1
Hungarian Music DVD (MAHASZ)	1
Irish Music DVD (IRMA)	6
Italian Music DVD (FIMI)	13
Spanish Music DVD (PROMUSICAE)	2
Swiss Music DVD (Schweizer Hitparade)	1
UK Music Videos (OCC)	3
US Music Video Sales (Billboard)	1

2014 weekly chart performance for Bring Me Home: Live 2011 (video)
Chart (2014)	Peak position
Swedish Music DVD (Sverigetopplistan)	1

Weekly chart performance for Bring Me Home: Live 2011 (album)
Chart (2012)	Peak position
Czech Albums (ČNS IFPI)	12
German Albums (Offizielle Top 100)	15
Hungarian Albums (MAHASZ)	7
Italian Albums (FIMI)	19
Japanese Albums (Oricon)	83
Mexican Albums (Top 100 Mexico)	73
Polish Albums (ZPAV)	3
Portuguese Albums (AFP)	11
Russian Albums (2M)	7

=== Year-end charts ===
Year-end chart performance for Bring Me Home: Live 2011 (video)
Chart (2012)	Position
Australian Music DVD (ARIA)	40
Belgian Music DVD (Ultratop Flanders)	13
Belgian Music DVD (Ultratop Wallonia)	8
Dutch Music DVD (Dutch Charts)	28
French Music DVD (SNEP)	21
Swedish Music DVD (Sverigetopplistan)	28
US Music Video Sales (Billboard)	13

Year-end chart performance for Bring Me Home: Live 2011 (album)
Chart (2012)	Position
Hungarian Albums (MAHASZ)	65

== Certifications ==
Certifications for Bring Me Home: Live 2011 (video)
Region	Certification	Certified units/sales
France (SNEP)	Gold	7,500^{*}
Poland (ZPAV)	2× Platinum	20,000^{*}
^{*} Sales figures based on certification alone.

== Release history ==
Release dates and formats for Bring Me Home: Live 2011
Region	Date	Format	Label	Ref.
United States	22 May 2012	DVD+CD; Blu-ray; digital download	Epic	
Germany	8 June 2012	DVD+CD; Blu-ray; digital download	Sony	
France	11 June 2012	DVD+CD; Blu-ray; digital download	Sony	
United Kingdom	11 June 2012	DVD+CD; Blu-ray; digital download	RCA	
Italy	12 June 2012	DVD+CD; Blu-ray; digital download	Sony	
Japan	13 June 2012	DVD+CD	Sony	
Australia	22 June 2012	DVD+CD; Blu-ray; digital download	Sony	
