= Lovers Live =

Live album by Sade
- Released: 5 February 2002
- Recorded: 20–21 September 2001
- Venue: Arrowhead Pond (Anaheim, California); Great Western Forum (Inglewood, California)
- Length: 69:55
- Label: Epic
- Director: Sophie Muller

Sade chronology
Lovers Rock (2000)	Lovers Live (2002)	Soldier of Love (2010)

Sade video chronology
Live (1994)	Lovers Live (2002)	Bring Me Home: Live 2011 (2012)

Lovers Live is the first live album and third video album by English band Sade, released on 5 February 2002 by Epic Records. It was recorded at the Arrowhead Pond in Anaheim, California, on 20 September 2001 and at the Great Western Forum in Inglewood, California, on 21 September as part of the band's Lovers Rock Tour. The CD contains 13 tracks, while the DVD contains 22 tracks as well as special features. The live version of the track "Somebody Already Broke My Heart" was released as a single from the album.

== Lovers Rock Tour ==
The album and DVD were recorded during the band's Lovers Rock Tour in September 2001. The tour ranked number 13 on Billboard's year-end tally, grossing $26,488,293 and drawing 491,151 audience members to 42 concerts. The tour featured India Arie and Youssou N'Dour as the opening acts.

== Critical reception ==
Professional ratings
Review scores
Source	Rating
AllMusic	4/5 stars
Q	3/5 stars
Rolling Stone	Favourable
The Rolling Stone Album Guide	3/5 stars

Brad Kohlenstein of AllMusic commented, "Above all things, the record is smooth. Sade's new songs mix seamlessly with classics from every stage of her career. An energetic eight-piece band breathes new life to the old tunes and offers another look at the Lovers Rock material. The highlight, of course, is Sade's intoxicating voice and it's clear that the audience is under her spell from her first breath. Lovers Live is a sum greater than any one of its parts, but there are some standout moments, like the rocking version of 'Paradise,' 'The Sweetest Gift' (a song written for her daughter), and a haunting rendition of 'Jezebel.' Even though the recordings were taking from various performances throughout the tour, the album feels like one cohesive performance and makes for a great listen all the way through."

J. Victoria Sanders of PopMatters noted, "It may be easier for Sade to become even more of an international force if her live show reflected more energy and passion that is sometimes offered in her studio work. She will always be appreciated for her sweetness and the temperate nature of her songs. There's nothing wrong with being cool and smooth – we all need some of that sometimes. But when and if Sade can move into a different musical space where she is brave enough to improvise onstage or surrender to the music in vocal phrases and not just words, she will be able to rise to legendary status. After all, it's not hard to love her – 48 million records sold worldwide prove that. It's just a bit of a stretch to love her formulaic live recording. Sade fans will see Lovers Live as a triumph. Music connoisseurs will see it as a bit dull (except for the eager fans at the concert who whooped and hollered), understanding that a woman capable of creating such beautiful music, is capable of a much more compelling performance."

== Commercial performance ==
Lovers Live reached number 10 on the US Billboard 200 and number 51 on the UK Albums Chart, Sade's first album to miss the top 20 in the United Kingdom. The album was certified gold by the Recording Industry Association of America (RIAA) on 7 March 2002, and had sold 562,000 copies in the United States by February 2006, while the DVD was certified platinum on 30 January 2003, denoting shipments in excess of 100,000 copies.

== Track listing ==
CD
No.	Title	Writer(s)	Length
1.	"Cherish the Day"	Sade Adu; Andrew Hale; Stuart Matthewman	6:37
2.	"Somebody Already Broke My Heart"	Adu; Matthewman; Hale; Paul S. Denman	5:13
3.	"Smooth Operator"	Adu; Ray St. John	4:16
4.	"Jezebel"	Adu; Matthewman	6:44
5.	"Kiss of Life"	Adu; Matthewman; Hale; Denman	4:58
6.	"Slave Song"	Adu; Matthewman; Hale; Denman	4:35
7.	"The Sweetest Gift"	Adu; Matthewman; Hale; Denman	2:32
8.	"The Sweetest Taboo"	Adu; Martin Ditcham	6:01
9.	"Paradise"	Adu; Matthewman; Hale; Denman	4:32
10.	"No Ordinary Love"	Adu; Matthewman	6:09
11.	"By Your Side"	Adu; Matthewman; Hale; Denman	4:54
12.	"Flow"	Adu; Matthewman; Hale; Denman	5:01
13.	"Is It a Crime?"	Adu; Matthewman; Hale	8:23
Total length:			69:55

Best Buy exclusive bonus disc
No.	Title	Length
1.	"Every Word"	4:20
2.	"Cherry Pie"	6:02

Borders exclusive bonus disc
No.	Title	Length
1.	"King of Sorrow"	4:56

Circuit City exclusive bonus disc
No.	Title	Length
1.	"Immigrant"	3:56
2.	"It's Only Love That Gets You Through"	3:50

Wherehouse exclusive bonus disc
No.	Title	Length
1.	"Lovers Rock"	4:30

DVD
No.	Title	Writer(s)	Length
1.	"Cherish the Day"	Adu; Hale; Matthewman	6:46
2.	"Your Love Is King"	Adu; Matthewman	4:38
3.	"Somebody Already Broke My Heart"	Adu; Matthewman; Hale; Denman	5:15
4.	"Cherry Pie"	Adu; Matthewman; Hale; Denman	6:06
5.	"Pearls"	Adu; Hale	4:47
6.	"Every Word"	Adu; Matthewman; Hale; Denman	4:13
7.	"Smooth Operator"	Adu; St. John	4:06
8.	"Redeye"	Matthewman; Hale	4:11
9.	"Jezebel"	Adu; Matthewman	6:43
10.	"Kiss of Life"	Adu; Matthewman; Hale; Denman	5:05
11.	"Slave Song"	Adu; Matthewman; Hale; Denman	4:21
12.	"The Sweetest Gift"	Adu; Matthewman; Hale; Denman	2:45
13.	"The Sweetest Taboo"	Adu; Ditcham	6:29
14.	"Lovers Rock"	Adu; Matthewman; Hale; Denman	4:24
15.	"Immigrant"	Adu; Janusz Podrazik	4:13
16.	"Paradise"	Adu; Matthewman; Hale; Denman	4:30
17.	"King of Sorrow"	Adu; Matthewman; Hale; Denman	4:51
18.	"No Ordinary Love"	Adu; Matthewman	5:47
19.	"By Your Side"	Adu; Matthewman; Hale; Denman	5:52
20.	"Flow"	Adu; Matthewman; Hale; Denman	5:35
21.	"Is It a Crime"	Adu; Matthewman; Hale	11:21
22.	"It's Only Love That Gets You Through"	Adu; Podrazik	4:01
23.	"Exclusive backstage footage"		7:41
24.	"Message to Sade"		10:16
25.	"King of Sorrow" (music video)		4:47
26.	"Black and white stills from the tour"
Total length:			138:43

Notes

- "Slave Song" contains an excerpt from "African Race" performed by The Abyssinians and written by Donald Manning, Neville Bernard Collins and Linford Elijah Manning.

== Personnel ==
Credits adapted from the liner notes of Lovers Live.

=== Sade ===
- Sade Adu – vocals
- Stuart Matthewman – guitar, saxophone
- Andrew Hale – keyboards
- Paul S. Denman – bass guitar

=== Additional musicians ===
- Ryan Waters – guitar
- Pete Lewinson – drums
- Karl Van Den Bossche – percussion
- Leroy Osbourne – vocals, guitar, flute
- Tony Momrelle – vocals

=== Technical ===
Concert sound

- Charlie Bouis – recording engineering
- Eric Johnston – engineering assistance
- Ian Duncan – Pro Tools recording
- Mike Pela – audio mixing
- Andrew Nichols – mixing assistance
- Howard Page – FOH sound engineering

Concert film

- Sophie Muller – direction
- Rob Small – production
- Steven Chivers – director of photography

=== Artwork ===
- Intro – design
- Idea – imaging

== Charts ==
=== Weekly charts ===
Weekly chart performance for Lovers Live (album)
Chart (2002)	Peak position
Austrian Albums (Ö3 Austria)	40
Belgian Albums (Ultratop Flanders)	34
Belgian Albums (Ultratop Wallonia)	11
Canadian Albums (Nielsen SoundScan)	56
Canadian R&B Albums (Nielsen SoundScan)	9
Dutch Albums (Album Top 100)	43
European Albums (Music & Media)	24
French Albums (SNEP)	36
German Albums (Offizielle Top 100)	41
Greek Albums (IFPI)	5
Hungarian Albums (MAHASZ)	21
Irish Albums (IRMA)	54
Italian Albums (FIMI)	16
Japanese Albums (Oricon)	94
Norwegian Albums (VG-lista)	25
Scottish Albums (OCC)	89
Spanish Albums (PROMUSICAE)	24
Swedish Albums (Sverigetopplistan)	50
Swiss Albums (Schweizer Hitparade)	27
UK Albums (OCC)	51
US Billboard 200	10
US Top R&B/Hip-Hop Albums (Billboard)	5

Weekly chart performance for Lovers Live (video)
Chart (2002)	Peak position
Australian Music DVD (ARIA)	16
Hungarian Music DVD (MAHASZ)	17
Swedish Music DVD (Sverigetopplistan)	1
UK Music Videos (OCC)	20
US Music Video Sales (Billboard)	1

=== Year-end charts ===
Year-end chart performance for Lovers Live (album)
Chart (2002)	Position
Canadian R&B Albums (Nielsen SoundScan)	96

Year-end chart performance for Lovers Live (video)
Chart (2002)	Position
Swedish Music DVD (Sverigetopplistan)	27

== Certifications ==
Certifications for Lovers Live
Region	Certification	Certified units/sales
Video
Brazil (Pro-Música Brasil)	Gold	25,000^{*}
Germany (BVMI)	Gold	25,000^{^}
United States (RIAA) video	Platinum	100,000^{^}
Album
Spain (PROMUSICAE)	Gold	50,000^{^}
United States (RIAA)	Gold	562,000
^{*} Sales figures based on certification alone.^{^} Shipments figures based on certification alone.

== Release history ==
Release dates and formats for Lovers Live
Region	Date	Format	Label	Ref(s)
United States	5 February 2002	CD	Epic	
Germany	18 February 2002	CD	Sony	
United Kingdom	18 February 2002	CD; DVD	Epic	
Japan	20 February 2002	CD	Sony	
Germany	25 February 2002	DVD	Sony	
United States	26 February 2002	DVD	Epic	
Australia	8 March 2002	CD	Sony	
Australia	12 April 2002	DVD	Sony	
Japan	29 June 2002	DVD	Sony	
