= Live (Sade video) =

Video by Sade
- Released: 22 November 1994
- Recorded: 2–3 October 1993
- Venue: SDSU Open Air Theatre (San Diego, California)
- Length: 96:00 (DVD)
- Label: Epic

Sade chronology
Life Promise Pride Love (1993)	Live (1994)	Lovers Live (2002)

Live is the first video album and first live release by English band Sade. It was released on 22 November 1994 on VHS by Epic Records, followed by a DVD release on 20 February 2001. It was filmed during the last two shows of the band's Love Deluxe World Tour at the SDSU Open Air Theatre in San Diego, California, on 2 and 3 October 1993.

== Track listing ==
1. "The Sweetest Taboo"
2. "Keep Looking"
3. "Your Love Is King"
4. "Love Is Stronger Than Pride"
5. "Smooth Operator"
6. "Red Eye"
7. "Haunt Me"
8. "Like a Tattoo"
9. "Kiss of Life"
10. "Nothing Can Come Between Us"
11. "Cherry Pie"
12. "Pearls"
13. "No Ordinary Love"
14. "Is It a Crime?"
15. "Cherish the Day"
16. "Paradise"
17. "Jezebel"

== Personnel ==
Credits adapted from the liner notes of Live.

=== Sade ===
- Sade Adu – lead vocals
- Andrew Hale – keyboards
- Stuart Matthewman – guitar, saxophone
- Paul S. Denman – bass

=== Additional personnel ===
- Rick Braun – trumpet
- Karl Van Den Bossche – percussion
- Gordon Hunte – guitar
- Trevor Murrell – drums
- Leroy Osbourne – backing vocals, flute
- Mike Pela – mixing

== Charts ==
Chart (2001)	Peak position
US Top Music Videos (Billboard)	8

== Certifications ==
Region	Certification	Certified units/sales
Brazil (Pro-Música Brasil)	Gold	25,000^{*}
United States (RIAA)	2× Platinum	200,000^{^}
^{*} Sales figures based on certification alone.^{^} Shipments figures based on certification alone.
