= The Best of Sade =

1994 greatest hits album by Sade

Greatest hits album by Sade
- Released: 31 October 1994
- Recorded: 1983–1993
- Studios: The Power Plant (London) (Note: Tracks 1–7); Miraval (Le Val, France) (Note: Tracks 4–10); Compass Point (Nassau, Bahamas) (Note: Tracks 8–10); Marcadet (Paris); Condulmer (Venice) (Note: Tracks 11–13, 15 and 16); Ridge Farm (Surrey, England); The Hit Factory (London); Conway (Los Angeles) (Note: Track 14); Ameraycan (Los Angeles)
- Length: 74:03
- Label: Epic
- Producers: Hein Hoven; Robin Millar; Mike Pela; Ben Rogan; Sade

Sade chronology
Love Deluxe (1992)	The Best of Sade (1994)	Lovers Rock (2000)

Professional ratings
Review scores
Source	Rating
AllMusic	4.5/5 stars
Christgau's Consumer Guide	(1-star Honorable Mention)
Entertainment Weekly	A
Music Week	4/5 stars
The Rolling Stone Album Guide	3.5/5 stars

The Best of Sade is the first greatest hits album by English band Sade, released by Epic Records in the United Kingdom on 31 October 1994 and in the United States on 4 November 1994. The compilation chronicles Sade's first four studio albums, while also including non-single songs "Jezebel", "Like a Tattoo" and "Pearls", as well as "Please Send Me Someone to Love", which appeared in the soundtrack to the film Philadelphia. The album was digitally remastered in 2000.

The singles from Diamond Life, as well as Stronger Than Pride's "Paradise" and "Nothing Can Come Between Us", are presented in their 7″ edit forms; "Never as Good as the First Time" and "Cherish the Day" are remixes produced by Sade, also taken from their respective singles. None of this information is listed within the album's packaging. The album artwork is a photograph of Adu, taken on set in 1992 by Albert Watson when he directed the band's music video for "Feel No Pain".

== Critical reception ==
AllMusic's Jason Elias wrote, "By the time this was released in 1994, something unexpected happened. Sade's early work became classic and the later additions boasted even better vocals and songs that nicely improved on the theme. The timeless sound and class always exhibited makes Sade Adu and her band a no-brainer for an appealing compilation. Like Al Green's Greatest Hits, The Best of Sade doesn't detract from the original albums and is a marker of time, not the end of the act... Despite its riches, The Best of Sade doesn't include all of the best, since 'Maureen' and or 'Keep Looking' aren't here. It's a small complaint and The Best of Sade is a great overview." Robert Christgau called the album "another loungecore alternative".

== Track listing ==
No.	Title	Writer(s)	Producer(s)	Length
1.	"Your Love Is King" (from Diamond Life, 1984)	Sade Adu; Stuart Matthewman	Robin Millar	3:43
2.	"Hang On to Your Love" (edit of LP version, on Diamond Life, 1984)	Adu; Matthewman	Millar	4:31
3.	"Smooth Operator" (7" edit, on Diamond Life, 1984)	Adu; Ray St. John	Millar	4:18
4.	"Jezebel" (from Promise, 1985)	Adu; Matthewman	Millar	5:25
5.	"The Sweetest Taboo" (from Promise, 1985)	Adu; Martin Ditcham	Millar	4:25
6.	"Is It a Crime?" (from Promise, 1985)	Adu; Matthewman; Andrew Hale	Millar	6:17
7.	"Never as Good as the First Time" (remix edit, from Promise, 1985)	Adu; Matthewman	Millar; Ben Rogan; Mike Pela; Sade	3:59
8.	"Love Is Stronger Than Pride" (from Stronger Than Pride, 1988)	Adu; Matthewman; Hale	Sade; Pela^{[a]}; Rogan^{[a]}	4:18
9.	"Paradise" (remix, from Stronger Than Pride, 1988)	Adu; Matthewman; Hale; Paul S. Denman	Sade; Pela^{[a]}; Rogan^{[a]}	3:37
10.	"Nothing Can Come Between Us" (radio edit, from Stronger Than Pride, 1988)	Adu; Matthewman; Hale	Sade; Pela^{[a]}; Rogan^{[a]}	3:53
11.	"No Ordinary Love" (from Love Deluxe, 1992)	Adu; Matthewman	Sade; Pela^{[a]}	7:20
12.	"Like a Tattoo" (from Love Deluxe, 1992)	Adu; Matthewman; Hale	Sade; Pela^{[a]}	3:37
13.	"Kiss of Life" (radio edit, from Love Deluxe, 1992)	Adu; Matthewman; Hale; Denman	Sade; Pela^{[a]}	4:11
14.	"Please Send Me Someone to Love" (from Philadelphia soundtrack, 1994)	Percy Mayfield	Sade; Hein Hoven	3:42
15.	"Cherish the Day" (Sade remix, from Love Deluxe, 1992)	Adu; Matthewman; Hale	Sade; Pela^{[a]}	6:19
16.	"Pearls" (from Love Deluxe, 1992)	Adu; Hale	Sade; Pela^{[a]}	4:37
Total length:				74:03

=== Notes ===
- ^{^[a]} signifies a co-producer

== Personnel ==
Credits adapted from the liner notes of The Best of Sade.

=== Sade ===
- Sade Adu – vocals
- Andrew Hale – keyboards
- Stuart Matthewman – guitar, saxophone
- Paul S. Denman – bass

=== Additional musicians ===
- Dave Early – drums, percussion (tracks 1–7)
- Martin Ditcham – percussion (tracks 1–11, 13); drums (tracks 8–10, 13)
- Paul Cooke – drums (tracks 1–3)
- Terry Bailey – trumpet (tracks 1–7)
- Gordon Matthewman – trumpet (tracks 1–3)
- Pete Beachill – trombone (tracks 4–7)
- Leroy Osbourne – vocals (tracks 7–13, 15, 16)
- Jake Jacas – vocals (track 7)
- Gordon Hunte – guitar (tracks 9, 14)
- Nick Ingman – string arrangements (tracks 13, 16)
- Gavyn Wright – orchestra leader (tracks 11–13, 15, 16)
- Tony Pleeth – solo cello (track 16)
- Karl Van Den Bossche – percussion (track 14)
- Trevor Murrell – drums (track 14)

=== Technical ===
- Robin Millar – production (tracks 1–7)
- Mike Pela – production engineering (tracks 1–7); production (track 7); engineering, co-production (tracks 8–13, 15, 16)
- Pete Brown – engineering assistance (tracks 1–7)
- Simon Driscoll – engineering assistance (tracks 1–7)
- Ben Rogan – production (track 7); engineering, co-production (tracks 8–10)
- Sade – production (tracks 7–13, 15, 16), arrangement (tracks 8–13, 15, 16)
- Phil Legg – engineering assistance (tracks 4–7)
- Melanie West – engineering assistance (tracks 8–10)
- Vince McCartney – engineering assistance (tracks 8–10)
- Franck Segarra – engineering assistance (tracks 8–10)
- Olivier de Bosson – engineering assistance (tracks 8–10)
- Alain Lubrano – engineering assistance (tracks 8–10)
- Jean-Christophe Vareille – engineering assistance (tracks 8–10)
- Sandro Franchin – engineering assistance (tracks 11–13, 15, 16)
- Adrian Moore – engineering assistance (tracks 11–13, 15, 16)
- Marc Williams – engineering assistance (tracks 11–13, 15, 16)
- Hein Hoven – production, mixing (track 14)
- Ian Cooper – mastering

=== Artwork ===
- Albert Watson – photography
- Jo Strettel – photography
- Peter Brawne – design

== Charts ==
=== Weekly charts ===
1994–1995 weekly chart performance
Chart (1994–1995)	Peak position
Australian Albums (ARIA)	23
Austrian Albums (Ö3 Austria)	9
Belgian Albums (IFPI)	3
Canada Top Albums/CDs (RPM)	22
Danish Albums (Hitlisten)	9
Dutch Albums (Album Top 100)	21
European Albums (Music & Media)	5
Finnish Albums (Suomen virallinen lista)	12
French Compilation Albums (SNEP)	8
German Albums (Offizielle Top 100)	15
Hungarian Albums (MAHASZ)	12
Irish Albums (IFPI)	6
Italian Albums (Musica e dischi)	5
Japanese Albums (Oricon)	27
New Zealand Albums (RMNZ)	5
Norwegian Albums (VG-lista)	12
Portuguese Albums (AFP)	4
Scottish Albums (Official Charts)	26
Spanish Albums (AFYVE)	10
Swedish Albums (Sverigetopplistan)	7
Swiss Albums (Schweizer Hitparade)	11
UK Albums (Official Charts)	6
UK R&B Albums (Official Charts)	1
US Billboard 200	9
US Top R&B/Hip-Hop Albums (Billboard)	7

1999 weekly chart performance
Chart (1999)	Peak position
Belgian Albums (Ultratop Wallonia)	38

2005 weekly chart performance
Chart (2005)	Peak position
UK Jazz & Blues Albums (Official Charts)	4

2010 weekly chart performance
Chart (2010)	Peak position
Polish Albums (ZPAV)	6

2022 weekly chart performance
Chart (2022)	Peak position
Greek Albums (IFPI Greece)	2

2024 weekly chart performance
Chart (2022)	Peak position
Belgian Albums (Ultratop Flanders)	126
US Contemporary Jazz Albums (Billboard)	1

2025–2026 weekly chart performance
Chart (2025–2026)	Peak position
Belgian Albums (Ultratop Flanders)	20
Croatian International Albums (HDU)	30
Dutch Albums (Album Top 100)	19
Greek Albums (IFPI)	26
Portuguese Albums (AFP)	19
UK Jazz & Blues Albums (Official Charts)	1

=== Year-end charts ===
1994 year-end chart performance
Chart (1994)	Position
Dutch Albums (Album Top 100)	63
Italian Albums (Musica e dischi)	54
Swedish Albums (Sverigetopplistan)	79
UK Albums (OCC)	40

1995 year-end chart performance
Chart (1995)	Position
Dutch Albums (Album Top 100)	83
European Albums (Music & Media)	52
Italian Albums (Musica e dischi)	40
US Billboard 200	45
US Top R&B/Hip-Hop Albums (Billboard)	19

2024 year-end chart performance
Chart (2024)	Position
Belgian Albums (Ultratop Flanders)	176

2025 year-end chart performance
Chart (2025)	Position
Belgian Albums (Ultratop Flanders)	126
Dutch Albums (Album Top 100)	63
US Billboard 200	161
US Top R&B/Hip-Hop Albums (Billboard)	69

== Certifications ==
Certifications for The Best of Sade
Region	Certification	Certified units/sales
Argentina (CAPIF)	Platinum	60,000^{^}
Australia (ARIA)	3× Platinum	210,000^{^}
Austria (IFPI Austria)	Gold	25,000^{*}
Belgium (BRMA)	Platinum	50,000^{*}
Brazil (Pro-Música Brasil)	Gold	100,000^{*}
Canada (Music Canada)	3× Platinum	300,000^{‡}
Denmark (IFPI Danmark)	3× Platinum	60,000^{‡}
Finland (Musiikkituottajat)	Gold	34,474
France (SNEP)	2× Gold	200,000^{*}
Germany (BVMI)	Gold	250,000^{^}
Italy (FIMI)	Platinum	50,000^{*}
Japan (RIAJ)	Gold	100,000^{^}
Netherlands (NVPI)	Platinum	100,000^{^}
New Zealand (RMNZ)	Platinum	15,000^{^}
New Zealand (RMNZ) reissue	Gold	7,500^{‡}
Spain (Promusicae)	Platinum	100,000^{^}
United Kingdom (BPI) 1994 release	Platinum	300,000^{^}
United Kingdom (BPI) 2000 release	2× Platinum	600,000^{^}
United States (RIAA)	4× Platinum	4,000,000^{^}
Summaries
Europe (IFPI)	2× Platinum	2,000,000^{*}
^{*} Sales figures based on certification alone.^{^} Shipments figures based on certification alone.^{‡} Sales+streaming figures based on certification alone.
