= List of awards and nominations received by Sade =

Sade awards and nominations
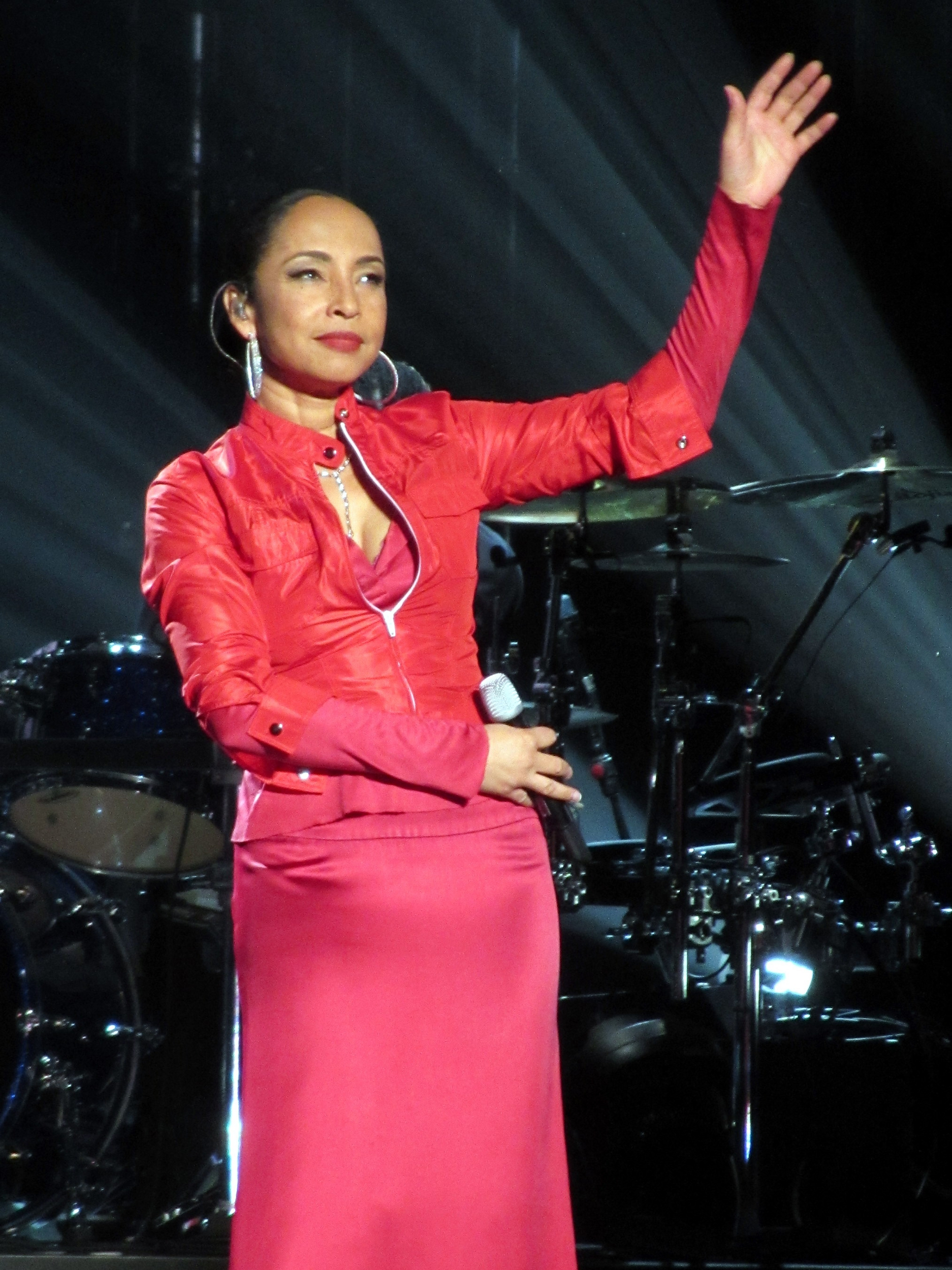
- Sade performing at the SAP Arena, Mannheim, Germany, in 2011
Awards and nominations
| Award | Wins | Nominations |
| American Black Achievement Awards | 0 | 1 |
| American Music Awards | 1 | 5 |
| BET Awards | 0 | 2 |
| Billboard Music Awards | 0 | 2 |
| BRIT Awards | 1 | 4 |
| Grammy Awards | 4 | 10 |
| MOBO Awards | 0 | 2 |
| MTV Video Music Awards | 0 | 2 |
| NAACP Image Awards | 0 | 4 |
| Porin Awards | 2 | 3 |
| Soul Train Awards | 0 | 8 |

Totals (Note: Certain award groups do not simply award one winner. They acknowledge several different recipients, have runners-up, and have third place. Since this is a specific recognition and is different from losing an award, runner-up mentions are considered wins in this award tally. For simplification and to avoid errors, each award in this list has been presumed to have had a prior nomination.)
- Wins: 10
- Nominations: 42

== ASCAP Pop Music Awards ==
The American Society of Composers, Authors and Publishers (ASCAP) is a not-for-profit performance rights organization that protects its members' musical copyrights by monitoring public performances of their music, whether via a broadcast or live performance, and compensating them accordingly.

| Year | Nominee / work | Award | Result | Ref. |
|---|---|---|---|---|
| 1986 | "Smooth Operator" | Most Performed Songs | Won | |
| 1987 | "The Sweetest Taboo" | Most Performed Songs | Won | |

== American Black Achievement Awards ==
The American Black Achievement Award is presented by Ebony and Jet magazines and given to African Americans that have achieved success in a variety of fields. Sade has received one nomination.

| Year | Nominee / work | Award | Result | Ref. |
|---|---|---|---|---|
| 1986 | Sade | The Music Award | Nominated | |

== American Music Awards ==
The American Music Awards is an annual awards ceremony created by Dick Clark in 1973. Sade has received one award from five nominations.

| Year | Nominee / work | Award | Result | Ref. |
|---|---|---|---|---|
| 1986 | Sade | Favorite Soul/R&B Female Video Artist | Nominated | |
| 1989 | Sade | Favorite Soul/R&B Female Vocalist | Nominated | |
| 2002 | Sade | Favorite Adult Contemporary Artist | Won | |
| 2010 | Soldier of Love | Favorite Soul/R&B Female Artist | Nominated | |
| 2010 | Soldier of Love | Favorite Soul/R&B Album | Nominated | |

== BET Awards ==
The BET Awards are an annual awards ceremony created by Black Entertainment Television network (BET) in 2001. Sade has received two nominations.

| Year | Nominee / work | Award | Result | Ref. |
|---|---|---|---|---|
| 2010 | Sade | Best International Act | Nominated | |
| 2010 | Sade | Centric Award | Nominated | |

== BMI London Awards ==
| Year | Nominee / work | Award | Result | Ref. |
|---|---|---|---|---|
| 2000 | "The Sweetest Taboo" | 3 Million Award | Won | |
| 2002 | "By Your Side" | Pop Award | Won | |

== Billboard Music Awards ==
The Billboard Music Awards are held to honor artists for commercial performance in the U.S., based on record charts published by Billboard. The awards are based on sales data by Nielsen SoundScan and radio information by Nielsen Broadcast Data Systems. The award ceremony was held from 1990 to 2007, until its reintroduction in 2011. Before and after that time span, winners have been announced by Billboard, both in the press and as part of their year-end issue. Sade has received two nominations.

| Year | Nominee / work | Award | Result | Ref. |
|---|---|---|---|---|
| 2010 | Sade | Best International Act | Nominated | |
| 2011 | Sade | Female Albums Artist of the Year | Nominated | |

== Brit Awards ==
The Brit Awards are the British Phonographic Industry's annual pop music awards. The name was originally a shortened form of British or Britannia, but has subsequently become a "backronym" for British Record Industry Trust. Sade has received one award from four nominations.

| Year | Nominee / work | Award | Result | Ref. |
|---|---|---|---|---|
| 1985 | Diamond Life | British Album of the Year | Won | |
| 1985 | "Smooth Operator" | British Single of the Year | Nominated | |
| 1985 | Sade | British Female Solo Artist | Nominated | |
| 1986 | Sade | British Female Solo Artist | Nominated | |
| 1987 | Sade | British Female Solo Artist | Nominated | |
| 1989 | Sade | British Female Solo Artist | Nominated | |
| 2001 | Sade | British Female Solo Artist | Nominated | |
| 2002 | Sade | British Female Solo Artist | Nominated | |
| 2010 | Diamond Life | British Album of 30 Years | Nominated | |

== Grammy Awards ==
The Grammy Awards (originally called the Gramophone Awards or Grammys) are presented annually by the National Academy of Recording Arts and Sciences of the United States for outstanding achievements in the music industry. The awards ceremony features performances by prominent artists, and some of the awards of more popular interest are presented in a widely viewed televised ceremony. Sade has received four awards from ten nominations.

| Year | Nominee / work | Award | Result | Ref. |
|---|---|---|---|---|
| 1986 | Sade | Best New Artist | Won | |
| 1987 | Promise | Best R&B Performance by a Duo or Group with Vocal | Nominated | |
| 1994 | "No Ordinary Love" | Best R&B Performance by a Duo or Group with Vocal | Won | |
| 1995 | "Please Send Me Someone to Love" | Best R&B Performance by a Duo or Group with Vocal | Nominated | |
| 2002 | "By Your Side" | Best Female Pop Vocal Performance | Nominated | |
| 2002 | Lovers Rock | Best Pop Vocal Album | Won | |
| 2011 | "Babyfather" | Best Pop Performance by a Duo or Group with Vocals | Nominated | |
| 2011 | "Soldier of Love" | Best R&B Performance by a Duo or Group with Vocals | Won | |
| 2013 | Bring Me Home: Live 2011 | Best Long Form Music Video | Nominated | |
| 2026 | "Young Lion" | Best Music Video | Nominated | |

== MOBO Awards ==
The MOBO Awards, an acronym for "Music of Black Origin", were established in 1996 by Kanya King and Andy Ruffell. The MOBO Award show is held annually in the United Kingdom to recognize artists of any ethnicity or nationality performing black music. Sade has been nominated twice.

| Year | Nominee / work | Award | Result | Ref. |
|---|---|---|---|---|
| 2010 | Sade | Best UK R&B/Soul | Nominated | |
| 2010 | Sade | Best UK Act | Nominated | |

== MTV Video Music Awards ==
The MTV Video Music Awards were established in 1984 by MTV to celebrate the top music videos of the year. Sade has been nominated twice.

| Year | Nominee / work | Award | Result | Ref. |
|---|---|---|---|---|
| 1985 | "Smooth Operator" | Best Female Video | Nominated | |
| 1985 | "Smooth Operator" | Best New Artist in a Video | Nominated | |

== NAACP Image Awards ==
The NAACP Image Awards is an award presented annually by the American National Association for the Advancement of Colored People to honor outstanding people of color in film, television, music, and literature. The 35 categories of Image Awards are voted on by members of the NAACP. Sade received four nominations.

| Year | Nominee / work | Award | Result | Ref. |
|---|---|---|---|---|
| 2011 | Sade | Outstanding Female Artist | Nominated | |
| 2011 | "Soldier of Love" | Outstanding Music Video | Nominated | |
| 2011 | "Soldier of Love" | Outstanding Song | Nominated | |
| 2011 | Soldier of Love | Outstanding Album | Nominated | |

== Porin Awards ==
The Porin Awards are a Croatian music award founded by Croatian Phonographic Association, Croatian Musicians Union, Croatian Radiotelevision and Croatian Composers' Society. Sade has won two awards from three nominations.

| Year | Nominee / work | Award | Result | Ref. |
|---|---|---|---|---|
| 2011 | Soldier of Love | Best International Album Outside of Classical and Jazz Music | Won | |
| 2011 | "Soldier of Love" | Best International Song | Won | |
| 2013 | Bring Me Home: Live 2011 | Outstanding Female Artist | Nominated | |

== RTHK International Pop Poll Awards ==
| Year | Nominee / work | Award | Result | Ref. |
|---|---|---|---|---|
| 2012 | Sade | Top Group/Band | Nominated | |

== Rock and Roll Hall of Fame ==
The Rock and Roll Hall of Fame is a museum located on the shores of Lake Erie in downtown Cleveland, Ohio, United States, dedicated to the recording history of some of the best-known and most influential artists, producers, and other people who have influenced the music industry.

| Year | Nominee / work | Award | Result | Ref. |
|---|---|---|---|---|
| 2024 | —N/a | Performer | Nominated | |

== Soul Train Awards ==
=== Soul Train Music Awards ===
The Soul Train Music Awards is an annual award show aired in national television syndication that honors the best in Black music and entertainment. It is produced by the makers of Soul Train, the program from which it takes its name, and features musical performances by various R&B and hip hop music recording artists interspersed throughout the ceremonies. Sade has received seven nominations.

| Year | Nominee / work | Award | Result | Ref. |
|---|---|---|---|---|
| 1987 | Promise | Best Jazz Album, Solo | Nominated | |
| 1989 | Stronger Than Pride | Best R&B/Urban Contemporary Album, Female | Nominated | |
| 1989 | Stronger Than Pride | Best Jazz Album | Nominated | |
| 1993 | Love Deluxe | Best R&B/Soul Album, Female | Nominated | |
| 2002 | Lovers Rock | Best R&B/Soul Album, Female | Nominated | |
| 2010 | Soldier of Love | Best R&B/Soul Song of the Year | Nominated | |
| 2010 | Soldier of Love | Best R&B/Soul Album of the Year | Nominated | |

=== Soul Train Lady of Soul Awards ===
The Soul Train Lady of Soul Award is an annual award special that first aired in 1995 that honors the best in African-American music and entertainment by female artist. It is produced by the makers of Soul Train, the program from which it takes its name. Sade has received one nomination.

| Year | Nominee / work | Award | Result | Ref. |
|---|---|---|---|---|
| 2001 | Lovers Rock | R&B/soul album of the year, solo | Nominated | |
