= Somebody Already Broke My Heart =

Single by Sade

from the album Lovers Live
- Released: 2003
- Recorded: 20–21 September 2001
- Venue: Arrowhead Pond (Anaheim, California); Great Western Forum (Inglewood, California)
- Genre: Soul; R&B
- Length: 5:13
- Label: Epic
- Songwriter(s): Sade Adu; Stuart Matthewman; Andrew Hale; Paul S. Denman

Sade singles chronology
| "King of Sorrow" (2001) | "Somebody Already Broke My Heart" (2003) | "Soldier of Love" (2009) |

Audio
- "Somebody Already Broke My Heart" on YouTube

"Somebody Already Broke My Heart" is a song by the English band Sade, produced as a single from their 2002 live album Lovers Live released by Epic Records. The studio version of the song was initially featured in their 2000 album Lovers Rock.

== Reception ==
In his review of the studio version of the song, Vulture's Frank Guan gave "Somebody Already Broke My Heart" top billing, writing "If there’s anything harder than falling in love, it’s falling in love again after being betrayed many times over. There’s a vulnerability in this song that goes beyond even the high standard set by the rest of the Sade catalog, a sense that, faced with a love affair that hasn’t even really yet begun, she’s skipping past the rapture of infatuation straight to the painful end; and that she somehow has the strength of character to do this knowingly and willingly. "If someone has to lose, I don’t want to play," she sings, but there she goes, diving into the future disaster; “I can’t go there again,” she decides, but she actually can. There really is such a thing as a genius of feeling, and Sade has it in abundance. Among all of her songs none are stronger or wiser than this. "Here I am, so don’t leave me stranded."

== Track listing ==
| No. | Title | Writer(s) | Length |
|---|---|---|---|
| 1. | "Somebody Already Broke My Heart" | Sade Adu; Stuart Matthewman; Andrew Hale; Paul S. Denman | 5:13 |
