= Bring Me Home =

Bring Me Home may refer to:

- Bring Me Home (film), a 2019 South Korean film
- Bring Me Home: Live 2011, a 2012 video by British band Sade
- "Bring Me Home", a song from the 2010 album Soldier of Love by Sade
- "Bring Me Home", a song from the 2019 album About Us by Australian singer G Flip
