= Orange (band) =

American-British punk rock band

- Lead singer Joe Dexter at The Building 2012, Eindhoven, the Netherlands

Background information
- Origin: Los Angeles, California, United States
- Genres: Pop punk; punk rock
- Years active: 2002–2016, 2017, 2019–present
- Label: Hellcat
- Members: Joe Dexter; James Bull; Danny Snow; Billy Wood
- Past members: Mike Valentine; Jack Berglund; Jon DeRing; Brendan Minded; Zak Glosserman; Perry Ladish; Alec Gomez
- Website: facebook.com/orangeband

Orange is an American-British pop punk/punk band from Los Angeles, California, formed in 2002.

The band were first signed to Hellcat/Epitaph Records by Tim Armstrong of Rancid when they were only 16 years old and since then have toured the world with many bands such as Misfits, The Adicts, UK Subs, Rancid, Reel Big Fish, Bowling for Soup and Zebrahead and have been on several TV shows including The O.C. and The Hills; and their song "Revolution" was used as the theme song to Cartoon Network's show Generator Rex. They have released four albums, Welcome to the World of Orange, Escape from LA, Phoenix, and Dead Sexy; and singles such as "Late Nights and Early Mornings" as well as a cover of "I Wish It Could Be Christmas Everyday".

== Band members ==
Joe Dexter is the son of bassist and songwriter Paul Denman, who is the current bassist for Sade.

James Bull is also the current drummer for British anarcho-punk band Rubella Ballet.

Billy Wood is also the current bass player for London ska band Buster Shuffle and former bass player for the punk band Sham 69.

Danny Snow is also the guitar player for the metal band River Becomes Ocean.

Current line-up

- Joe Dexter - lead vocals (2002–2016, 2017, 2019–present); rhythm guitar (2017, 2019–present); bass guitar (2002–2016)
- James Bull - drums (2016, 2017, 2019–present)
- Danny Snow - lead guitar (2017, 2019–present)
- Billy Wood - bass guitar (2017, 2019–present)

Former members

- Mike Valentine - rhythm guitar (2002–2008)
- Jack Berglund - lead guitar (2002–2008)
- Jon DeRing - rhythm guitar (2008)
- Zak Glosserman - drums (2002–2014)
- Perry Ladish - rhythm guitar (2008–2014)
- Brendan Minded - lead guitar (2009)
- Alec Gomez - lead guitar (2009–2014)

Touring members

- Brendan Minded - lead guitar (2009)
- Jon DeRing - rhythm guitar (2005)

== Discography ==
- Rock n Roar [demo] - 2003
- Welcome to the World of Orange - 2004
- Escape from LA - 2007
- Phoenix - 2010
- Dead Sexy (EP) - 2011
- "The Hardest Pill to Swallow" (Single) - 2013
- "Late Nights and Early Mornings" (Single) - 2017
- "I Wish It Could Be Christmas Everyday" (Single) - 2019
- "Lesbian Boyfriend" (Single) - 2026
