= List of number-one albums of 2000 (Poland) =

These are the Polish number one albums of 2000, per the OLiS Chart.

== Chart history ==
| Issue date | Album | Artist(s) | Reference(s) |
|---|---|---|---|
| November 6 | Music | Madonna | |
| November 13 | Golec uOrkiestra 2 | Golec uOrkiestra | |
| November 20 | Golec uOrkiestra 2 | Golec uOrkiestra | |
| November 27 | Golec uOrkiestra 2 | Golec uOrkiestra | |
| December 4 | Lovers Rock | Sade | |
| December 18 | A Day Without Rain | Enya | |
