= Soldier of Love (Sade song) =

Single by Sade

from the album Soldier of Love
- B-side: "Flow"
- Released: 8 December 2009
- Recorded: 2009
- Genre: Trip hop; downtempo; rock
- Length: 5:57
- Label: Epic
- Songwriters: Sade Adu; Andrew Hale; Stuart Matthewman; Paul S. Denman
- Producers: Sade; Mike Pela

Sade singles chronology
"Somebody Already Broke My Heart" (2003)	"Soldier of Love" (2009)	"Babyfather" (2010)

Music video
- "Soldier of Love" on YouTube

"Soldier of Love" is the first single and title track from the album's same title by the English band Sade. It premiered worldwide on 8 December 2009, and it was released on iTunes digitally on 12 January 2010. It was also the band's first new material in almost ten years, preceding their long-awaited sixth studio album of the same name which was released worldwide on 8 February 2010. The song was number-one on the Billboard Adult R&B. The song debuted at #58 on the Billboard Hot 100 becoming the band's highest debut on the chart. It peaked at number 52, making it the band's highest-peaking single on that chart since 1992's "No Ordinary Love".

The track won the Grammy for Best R&B Performance by a Duo or Group with Vocals at the 53rd Grammy Awards ceremony. The song was used during the end credits of The Lady, a 2010 film directed by Luc Besson based on eyewitness accounts of former Burmese political prisoner Aung San Suu Kyi and her husband, Michael Aris.

== Background ==
The song was written by Sade Adu along with the other band members and recorded by the end of the summer in 2009.

== Critical reception ==
"Soldier of Love" has been received positively from the music critics, who praised the band's comeback. Pitchfork Media hailed the singer's "incomparable voice, which sounds as passionately poised as it did on 1984's Diamond Life." The Hollywood Reporter gave also a positive review, saying that "It may be just a taste of what's to come, but Sade's latest definitely has its listeners at attention." Digital Spy rated the song four stars out of five, and described it as "a bit of revelation – a rich, atmospheric pop symphony". Rolling Stone called it an "amazing ballad of utter emotional devastation" as well as "classic Sade – a cool and collected song about falling apart," and ranked the song number three on its list of the 50 Best Songs of 2010. Frank Guan of Vulture added "The title track from Sade’s sixth album lives up to its martial allusions: The guitar punches more than it licks, and the drums rattle like a military march. Love used to be stronger than pride; now loss is stronger than love."

== Chart performance ==
The single was serviced to radio stations on Tuesday, 8 December, and after only one day of airplay in the chart's tracking week of 19 December 2009 "Soldier of Love" debuted at number 49 on the U.S. Billboard Hot R&B/Hip-Hop Songs chart. Since then, it has peaked at number-6 on the chart, making it the band's first top-ten appearance on the chart since "Kiss of Life" peaked at number-ten in 1993.

The track debuted at number 11 on the Urban Hot AC chart, making it the highest debut of the decade and the third highest all-time on the Urban Hot AC chart. It debuted at number 58 on the Billboard Hot 100 with the song peaking at number 52, and remaining on the chart for 11 weeks. The song became the band's first number-one on the U.S. Adult R&B chart. The song rose 3–1 in its sixth week, marking the chart's speediest ascent to the top spot since Anita Baker topped the chart in under five weeks with "You're My Everything" in 2004.

"Soldier of Love" became the first ever vocal to hit number-one on the Smooth Jazz Top 20 countdown. Each of the tally's 45 previous leaders had been instrumentals.

== Music video ==
The "Soldier of Love" music video made its premiere onto the internet via Amazon.com on 10 January 2010. It was directed by British director Sophie Muller and choreographed by Fatima Robinson. The music video, rich in odd symbolism, left many viewers wondering what it meant. It is set in a desert landscape and featured soldiers dancing and marching along the song's beats and featured Adu in a rodeo-esque style as she rode a white stallion, with smoldering and fiery explosions in the background. Adu said the soldiers in the video represent her emotions "in the battle ground of life".

== Singles ==
US Wal-Mart CD single
No.	Title	Music	Length
1.	"Soldier of Love"	S. Adu, S. Matthewman, P. S. Denman, A. Hale	5:58
2.	"Flow (from the album Lovers Rock)"	S. Adu, S. Matthewman, P. S. Denman, A. Hale	4:34

iTunes Edition
No.	Title	Music	Length
1.	"Soldier of Love (Radio Edit)"	S. Adu, S. Matthewman, P. S. Denman, A. Hale	4:33

== Charts ==
=== Weekly charts ===
Weekly chart performance for "Soldier of Love"
Chart (2010)	Peak position
Belgium (Ultratop 50 Flanders)	47
Belgium (Ultratop 50 Wallonia)	9
Canada Hot 100 (Billboard)	84
CIS Airplay (TopHit)	183
France Download (SNEP)	37
Italy (Musica e dischi)	22
Japan (Japan Hot 100)	9
Mexico Ingles Airplay (Billboard)	41
Netherlands (Dutch Top 40 Tipparade)	9
Spain (PROMUSICAE)	48
Sweden (Sverigetopplistan)	23
Switzerland (Schweizer Hitparade)	25
UK Singles (OCC)	123
UK Hip Hop/R&B (OCC)	35
US Billboard Hot 100	52
US Hot R&B/Hip-Hop Songs (Billboard)	6
US Smooth Jazz Airplay (Billboard)	1

=== Year-end charts ===
Year-end chart performance for "Soldier of Love"
Chart (2010)	Position
Belgium (Ultratop 50 Wallonia)	89
Japan Adult Contemporary (Billboard)	37
US Hot R&B/Hip-Hop Songs (Billboard)	37
US Smooth Jazz Songs (Billboard)	16

== Release history ==
Country	Date	Format	Label
United States	8 December 2009	Airplay	Epic Records
United States	12 January 2010	Digital download, CD single	Epic Records
United Kingdom	8 February 2010	Digital download, vinyl	Sony Music
