= King of Sorrow =

2001 single by Sade

Single by Sade

from the album Lovers Rock
- Released: 12 March 2001
- Genre: Soul
- Length: 4:53
- Label: Epic
- Songwriters: Sade Adu; Stuart Matthewman; Andrew Hale; Paul S. Denman
- Producers: Sade; Mike Pela

Sade singles chronology
"By Your Side" (2000)	"King of Sorrow" (2001)	"Somebody Already Broke My Heart" (2003)

Music video
- "King of Sorrow" on YouTube

"King of Sorrow" is a song by English band Sade from their fifth studio album, Lovers Rock (2000). It was released as the album's second and final single on 12 March 2001.

== Critical reception ==
Tanya Rena Jefferson of AXS wrote, "Sade sings a heartfelt song that is sad and deep of sorrow and no one can take her sorrows away. This song allows one to feel very dark inside. Yet, the music gives a sense of overwhelming soulful bliss that takes away the blues feeling of the song." A reviewer from People Magazine noted that "even such sad songs", as “King of Sorrow”, "attest to the adage that what doesn’t kill you makes you stronger." Frank Guan of Vulture said it "witnesses Sade anointing herself a monarch. Whether it's to memorialize romantic pain or to recover from it, the act of aggrandizement is easily forgiven."

== Music video ==
The music video for "King of Sorrow", directed by Sophie Muller, was filmed at and around the Normandie Hotel in San Juan, Puerto Rico and Ponce, Puerto Rico. It follows the dilemma of a single mother struggling to conciliate her children's needs with her dream of becoming a singer. The video was inspired by the 1960 French-Italian film Two Women, starring Sophia Loren.

== Track listings ==
- UK CD 1
1. "King of Sorrow" (Radio Version) – 3:48
2. "King of Sorrow" (Guru Remix) – 3:47
- UK CD 2 and Dutch maxi-CD single
1. "King of Sorrow" (Radio Version) – 3:48
2. "King of Sorrow" (Guru Remix) – 3:47
3. "King of Sorrow" (Fun Lovin' Criminals Remix) – 4:32
4. "King of Sorrow" (Cottonbelly Remix) – 5:57
5. "King of Sorrow" (Video)
- UK and European 12-inch maxi single

A1. "King of Sorrow" (Guru Remix) – 3:47
A2. "King of Sorrow" (Fun Lovin' Criminals Remix) – 4:32
B1. "King of Sorrow" (Cottonbelly Remix) – 5:57
B2. "King of Sorrow" (Radio Version) – 3:48

== Charts ==
Weekly chart performance for "King of Sorrow"
Chart (2001)	Peak position
Canada (Nielsen SoundScan)	48
Netherlands (Single Top 100)	82
Poland Airplay (Music & Media)	7
Scotland Singles (OCC)	88
UK Singles (OCC)	59
UK Hip Hop/R&B (OCC)	13
US Bubbling Under R&B/Hip-Hop Songs (Billboard)	1

== Release history ==
Region	Date	Format(s)	Label(s)	Ref.
United States	27 February 2001	Urban; urban adult contemporary radio	Epic	
United Kingdom	12 March 2001	12-inch vinyl; CD; cassette	Epic	
