= Kiss of Life (Sade song) =

Single by Sade

from the album Love Deluxe
- B-side: "Room 55"
- Released: 26 April 1993
- Recorded: 1992
- Genre: Smooth jazz
- Length: 5:50 (album version); 4:11 (single version)
- Label: Epic
- Songwriters: Sade Adu; Stuart Matthewman; Andrew Hale; Paul S. Denman
- Producer: Sade

Sade singles chronology
"Feel No Pain" (1992)	"Kiss of Life" (1993)	"Cherish the Day" (1993)

Music video
- "Kiss of Life" on YouTube

"Kiss of Life" is a song by English band Sade from their fourth studio album, Love Deluxe (1992). It was written by Sade Adu, Stuart Matthewman, Andrew Hale and Paul S. Denman, and produced by the band and Mike Pela. The song was released as the album's third single in 1993 by Epic Records. It reached number 44 on the UK Singles Chart and number 78 on the US Billboard Hot 100, while becoming Sade's seventh top-10 single on Billboard's Hot R&B/Hip-Hop Songs chart, peaking at number 10. It also received significant airplay on smooth jazz radio stations. Albert Watson directed the music video for the song.

== Composition ==
"Kiss of Life" was originally published in the key of A Major in common time with a tempo of 97 beats per minute. Adu's vocals span from G#_{3} to C#_{5}.

== Critical reception ==
Randy Clark from Cash Box described "Kiss of Life" as a "compelling love song in the same, easily identifiable soul-groove niche she carved out for herself" in 1985 with "Smooth Operator". Dave Sholin from the Gavin Report felt it "sounds like a natural follow-up" to "No Ordinary Love". Alan Jones from Music Week deemed it "one of her most expressive pieces, with fluted notes and the odd wail all melding nicely in a warm, summery setting." He added, "If she were a new artist, she'd attract immediate and overwhelming attention." James Hamilton from the Record Mirror Dance Update described it as "Suzanne Vega-ish". Leesa Daniels from Smash Hits gave it three out of five, writing, "You know exactly what you're going to get; the slow beat, saxophone solo, bongo drums and her husky vocals. Even so, this is perfect background music for watching the sun go down with the person you really want to snog!"

== Music video ==
The music video for "Kiss of Life" was directed by Albert Watson. It was filmed in and around Miami, Florida. Included in the video are shots of the Washington Park Hotel in South Beach.

== Retrospective response ==
In a 2017 review, Justin Chadwick from Albumism called the song "wonderful", naming it one of "their most evocative and enduring love songs to date". In 2010, The Daily Vault's Mark Millan said that it "however, leaves nothing to chance as it is the kind of simple but heartfelt love song that Sade is so good at producing." Frank Guan of Vulture commented, "Her love songs typically split between the ones where love is flawless and the ones where love is threatened, and this falls clearly in the former category. A rich funk bassline laced with jazz piano provides the perfect backdrop for this ode to the best of feelings."

== Track listings ==
- 7-inch single

A. "Kiss of Life" – 4:10
B. "Room 55" – 4:20

- 12-inch single

A. "Kiss of Life" – 4:10
B1. "Room 55" – 4:20
B2. "Kiss of Life" (album version) – 5:48

- UK CD single
1. "Kiss of Life" – 4:10
2. "Room 55" – 4:20
3. "Kiss of Life" (album version) – 5:48
- UK and Australian CD single (cardboard sleeve) / Japanese mini CD single / US cassette single
1. "Kiss of Life" – 4:10
2. "Room 55" – 4:20

== Charts ==
=== Weekly charts ===
Weekly chart performance for "Kiss of Life"
Chart (1993)	Peak position
Australia (ARIA)	186
Canada Top Singles (RPM)	30
Canada Adult Contemporary (RPM)	21
Europe (European Hit Radio)	20
Germany (GfK)	88
Iceland (Íslenski Listinn Topp 40)	14
New Zealand (Recorded Music NZ)	33
UK Singles (Official Charts)	44
US Billboard Hot 100	78
US Adult Contemporary (Billboard)	20
US Hot R&B/Hip-Hop Songs (Billboard)	10
US Cash Box Top 100	44
US Top 100 R&B Singles (Cash Box)	2

Chart (2026)	Peak position
Netherlands (Single Tip)	16

=== Year-end charts ===
Year-end chart performance for "Kiss of Life"
Chart (1993)	Position
US Hot R&B/Hip-Hop Songs (Billboard)	66
US Top 100 R&B Singles (Cash Box)	31

== Certifications ==
Certifications and sales for "Kiss of Life"
Region	Certification	Certified units/sales
Denmark (IFPI Danmark)	Gold	45,000^{‡}
New Zealand (RMNZ)	Platinum	30,000^{‡}
United Kingdom (BPI)	Silver	200,000^{‡}
^{‡} Sales+streaming figures based on certification alone.
