= By Your Side (Sade song) =

2000 single by Sade

Single by Sade

from the album Lovers Rock
- Released: 3 October 2000
- Genre: Chamber pop; soft rock
- Length: 4:34
- Label: Epic
- Songwriters: Sade Adu; Andrew Hale; Stuart Matthewman; Paul S. Denman
- Producer: Sade

Sade singles chronology
| "Cherish the Day" (1993) | "By Your Side" (2000) | "King of Sorrow" (2001) |

Music video
- "By Your Side" on YouTube

"By Your Side" is a song by English band Sade from their fifth studio album, Lovers Rock (2000). Written by Sade Adu, and produced by her and Mike Pela, it was released as the album's lead single in the United States on 3 October 2000 and in the United Kingdom on 6 November 2000. The track was nominated for Best Female Pop Vocal Performance at the 44th Annual Grammy Awards in 2001. The music video for the single was directed by Sophie Muller. In 2002, the song was listed as the 48th greatest love song of all time by VH1.

== Critical reception ==
The single received favourable reviews from music critics. Justin Chadwick from Albumism stated that it "stands as one of the most endearing anthems of unconditional love to emerge in the 21st century thus far". AllMusic editor Ed Hogan said that "never before has the singer infused more mainstream rock elements (prominent strummed guitars) into her music as evidenced by the first single, "By Your Side"." Tanya Rena Jefferson of AXS considers it to be the group's best, commenting, "'By Your Side' is a heartfelt, beautiful song that allows Sade to express how one will not leave and will always be by one's side through thick and thin. This flavorful, mellow, powerful filled song is warm and allows the listener to understand the importance and sincerity of the lyrics."

The Daily Vault's Mark Millan wrote that the song is "one of their finest ever moments." He also described it as a "beautifully soulful track thanks to Adu’s heartfelt vocal performance that greatly enhances the song." Craig Seymour from Entertainment Weekly commented that since 1984, "Sade has made a career out of crooning smoky romantic odes; her first single in eight years, 'By Your Side,' is no different. Over a sharply produced, folksy groove, the Brit chanteuse crafts a guitar-driven declaration of resolute affection. As comforting as the love it describes." A reviewer from People Magazine noted that the song, "with its stripped-down arrangement laying bare a simple yet poignant lyric, is positively uplifting." Frank Guan of Vulture commented, "How does it feel to know there's someone who will never abandon you? A plain but thoroughly gripping hook anchors her pledge to be there in the worst of times."

== Music video ==
Sade in the video for "By Your Side". Wearing an Indian-inspired outfit, she walks through a forest.

The music video for the song was shot in Los Angeles and was directed by British director Sophie Muller, who revealed that it is a metaphor for Sade Adu's life. In the video, she is depicted as a mystical figure walking through a forest and into the city. As the singer walks through different scenes, she gathers items such as a rose and a burned stick of wood, and puts them in a small sack. At the end of the video, she walks into the city and is seen in the median of the road offering or selling the rose like a flower vendor. This strange journey represents her life but "made into a beautiful, mysterious dream."

The idea for the video came when Sade and Muller were driving to the studio and saw people standing in the middle of the road selling flowers. At that sight, Muller thought "it was so sad to be constantly rejected by these cars" and thought, "Well, it's not such a bad job to be looking at beautiful flowers all day." This gave rise to the video's concept of someone who has been away, and is now standing offering a flower to someone. At the time, eight years had passed since the group last released an album. The flower Sade offers to passersby at the end of the video symbolizes the band's latest album, Lovers Rock, that she is offering to the world.

Regarding her role as a director, Sophie Muller said that "she [Sade] had not done anything in eight years—there had not even been a photograph taken of her. I think I was being protective the day we did it; I did not want to push her to do something incredibly difficult, but wanted to ease her back in."

The video contains very extreme and vivid colors, which were inspired by Chinese and Indian films as well as Japanese masters. Specifically, the pale green light was influenced by Indian over-saturated imagery. This is because the director wanted each bit to be different and "wanted to make it like reality, but more beautiful". For example, the forest was meant to be like a forest, but a bit more peaceful than a real one would be. Not many special effects were used in the making of the video. Everything was built to look the way it does. The only visual effect is the huge field where she is seen walking. For it, a little field was built and painted all around her. And there was a little green screen, when she walks towards the city.

== Track listings ==
- European CD single
1. "By Your Side" (radio edit) – 4:17
2. "By Your Side" (The Neptunes remix) – 3:57
- UK and European CD maxi single
1. "By Your Side" – 4:17
2. "By Your Side" (The Neptunes remix) – 3:57
3. "By Your Side" (Yard mix 1) – 4:18
4. "By Your Side" (Reggae mix 1) – 3:57
5. "By Your Side" (music video)
- US CD maxi single
1. "By Your Side" – 4:17
2. "By Your Side" (The Neptunes remix) – 3:57
3. "By Your Side" (Yard mix 1) – 4:18
4. "By Your Side" (Reggae mix 1) – 3:57
- UK, European, and US 12-inch maxi single

A1. "By Your Side" (radio edit) – 4:17
A2. "By Your Side" (The Neptunes remix) – 3:57
B1. "By Your Side" (Yard mix 1) – 4:18
B2. "By Your Side" (Reggae mix 1) – 3:57

== Charts ==
=== Weekly charts ===
Weekly chart performance for "By Your Side"
| Chart (2000–2001) | Peak position |
|---|---|
| Belgium (Ultratip Bubbling Under Flanders) | 5 |
| Belgium (Ultratip Bubbling Under Wallonia) | 6 |
| Canada (Nielsen SoundScan) | 22 |
| Croatia (HRT) | 4 |
| Europe (Eurochart Hot 100 Singles) | 41 |
| Germany (GfK) | 67 |
| Ireland (IRMA) | 29 |
| Italy (FIMI) | 10 |
| Netherlands (Single Top 100) | 66 |
| Poland Airplay (Music & Media) | 14 |
| Poland (Polish Airplay Charts) | 10 |
| Portugal (AFP) | 8 |
| Scottish Singles Sales (Official Charts) | 23 |
| Spain (Promusicae) | 2 |
| Sweden (Sverigetopplistan) | 29 |
| Switzerland (Schweizer Hitparade) | 61 |
| UK Singles (Official Charts) | 17 |
| UK Hip Hop/R&B (Official Charts) | 4 |
| US Billboard Hot 100 | 75 |
| US Adult Contemporary (Billboard) | 18 |
| US Adult Pop Airplay (Billboard) | 35 |
| US Dance Club Songs (Billboard) | 2 |
| US Dance Singles Sales (Billboard) | 2 |
| US Hot R&B/Hip-Hop Songs (Billboard) | 41 |

=== Year-end charts ===
Year-end chart performance for "By Your Side"
| Chart (2001) | Position |
|---|---|
| Canada (Nielsen SoundScan) | 86 |
| US Dance Club Play (Billboard) | 15 |
| US Maxi-Singles Sales (Billboard) | 9 |

| Chart (2002) | Position |
|---|---|
| US Maxi-Singles Sales (Billboard) | 8 |

== Certifications ==
Certifications for "By Your Side"
| Region | Certification | Certified units/sales |
|---|---|---|
| Denmark (IFPI Danmark) | Gold | 45,000^{‡} |
| New Zealand (RMNZ) | Platinum | 30,000^{‡} |
| United Kingdom (BPI) | Silver | 200,000^{‡} |
^{‡} Sales+streaming figures based on certification alone.

== Release history ==
Release dates and formats for "By Your Side"
| Region | Date | Format(s) | Label(s) | Ref. |
|---|---|---|---|---|
| United States | 3 October 2000 | Contemporary hit; urban; urban AC radio | Epic | |
| United States | 9 October 2000 | Adult contemporary; hot adult contemporary; modern adult contemporary radio | Epic | |
| United States | 10 October 2000 | Rhythmic contemporary radio | Epic | |
| United Kingdom | 6 November 2000 | CD | Epic | |

== The 1975 version ==
"By Your Side"

Single by The 1975
- Released: 21 February 2017
- Genre: R&B; electropop; synth-pop; jazz
- Length: 4:55
- Label: Dirty Hit
- Songwriters: Sade Adu; Andrew Hale; Stuart Matthewman; Paul S. Denman
- Producer: Matthew Healy

The 1975 singles chronology
| "Loving Someone" (2017) | "By Your Side" (2017) | "Give Yourself a Try" (2018) |

Audio video
- "By Your Side" on YouTube

English band The 1975 released a cover version of "By Your Side" on 21 February 2017 as a charity single raising funds for War Child, a charity that provides aid to children in war-torn countries.

"This song for me... if you listen to Kanye, if you listen to Bono... that song 'By Your Side' has so much of that identity", frontman Matty Healy said. "When I was listening to it, I was listening to it with this real sense of modernity thinking wow, this is still really forward thinking. When we were going to go a gig for War Child... the idea of doing it for charity meant the sentiment of the song took on a whole different meaning, and it felt perfect. It's such a beautiful song."

=== Charts ===
Chart performance for "By Your Side"
| Chart (2017) | Peak position |
|---|---|
| Scottish Singles Sales (Official Charts) | 50 |
| UK Singles Downloads (Official Charts) | 51 |
| US Hot Rock & Alternative Songs (Billboard) | 32 |

== Other versions and in popular culture ==
- The song was covered by Beachwood Sparks on their album Once We Were Trees (2001). The video, directed by Chad Misner, was selected for the 2002 South by Southwest Film Festival. Their cover appeared on the soundtrack to the 2010 film Scott Pilgrim vs. the World.
- William "Billy" McCarthy (formerly of Pela and Augustines) covered the song for his 2017 debut solo album, Shelter.
- Canadian singer Justin Nozuka included a cover on his 2015 EP Chestnut Spoke to Maple.
- Mat Kearney covered the song on his 2018 album, Crazytalk.
- Ben Taylor covered this song on a 2013 episode of The Bachelor
- Noah Gundersen performed a stripped-down acoustic version for "The Cardinal Sessions," which was released on YouTube 18 March 2018. The cover is notable for its use of ambient echo, and Gundersen's use of falsetto.
- "By Your Side" appeared on the second-season episode "Headspace" of the American television series Ted Lasso.
- The song was played at the end of the Sex and the City episode "The Good Fight"
- "By Your Side" was also played in an episode of EastEnders on the 15th of May 2001.
- The song features in the film The Invite, where Pina (Penelope Cruz) sings along to the song while seducing Joe (Seth Rogen).
