= Lovers Rock (Sade album) =

Studio album by Sade
- Released: 13 November 2000
- Recorded: September 1999 – August 2000
- Studios: Sarm Hook End (Checkendon, Oxfordshire); El Cortijo (San Pedro de Alcántara, Spain); Deliverance (London)
- Genres: Soul; reggae
- Length: 44:10
- Label: Epic
- Producers: Sade; Mike Pela

Sade chronology
The Best of Sade (1994)	Lovers Rock (2000)	Lovers Live (2002)

Singles from Lovers Rock
- 1. "By Your Side" Released: 3 October 2000; 2. "King of Sorrow" Released: 12 March 2001

Lovers Rock is the fifth studio album by English band Sade, released on 13 November 2000 by Epic Records. The album was titled after a style of reggae music known as lovers rock, noted for its romantic sound and content, which frontwoman Sade Adu listened to in her youth. Lovers Rock was seen as a departure from the band's previous use of jazz elements, opting instead for a wider use of musical elements from soul music, R&B, soft rock, folk music, dub, reggae, neo soul and lovers rock. The album's production has been characterised as sparse, with simple arrangements and reggae flourishes. A concept album, the lyrics focus on both the positive and the negative sides of love; the album's lyrical content also touches upon political themes.

Upon release, Lovers Rock was met with generally positive reviews from music critics, who praised the band's musical direction. The album earned Sade the Grammy Award for Best Pop Vocal Album in 2002. Commercially, the album reached number 18 on the UK Albums Chart and number three on the US Billboard 200. It has since been certified platinum by the BPI in the UK, and triple platinum by the Recording Industry Association of America (RIAA), having sold over 3 million copies in the United States by February 2010. The album spawned two singles—"By Your Side" and "King of Sorrow"—and was further promoted by the band's Lovers Rock Tour.

== Background ==
The band's fourth studio album, Love Deluxe, was released on 26 October 1992. The album peaked at number three on the US Billboard 200 and has sold 3.4 million copies in the United States. It was later certified four-times platinum by the Recording Industry Association of America (RIAA) for shipments of four million copies. The album was also commercially successful elsewhere, reaching number one in France and the top 10 in the Netherlands, New Zealand, Sweden, Switzerland and the United Kingdom. Following the release of Love Deluxe, the band took an eight-year hiatus, during which Adu came under media scrutiny with rumours of depression and addiction, and later went on to give birth to her first child. During this time, the other members of the band—Stuart Matthewman, Paul S. Denman, and Andrew Hale—worked on side projects, including the band Sweetback, which released a self-titled album in 1996. Matthewman also played a major role in the development of Maxwell's career, providing instrumentation and production work for the R&B singer's first two albums.

== Recording ==
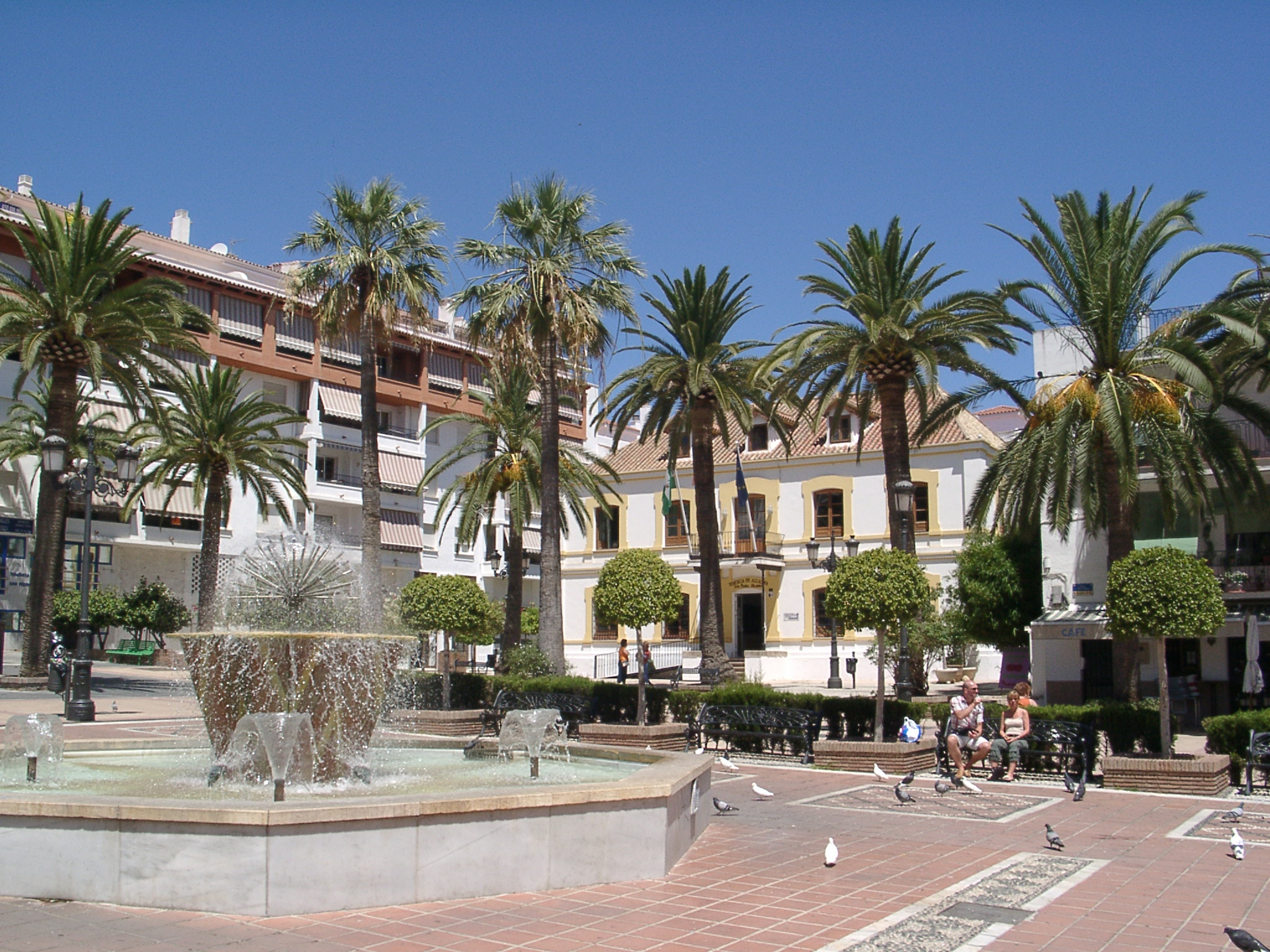
The album was partly recorded in London and San Pedro de Alcántara, Spain (pictured)

Lovers Rock was recorded over the course of a year, and was influenced by Adu's experiences during the eight-year hiatus. The album's recording took place between September 1999 and August 2000 at three locations—Sarm Hook End in Checkendon, Oxfordshire, Deliverance Studios in London, and El Cortijo Studios in San Pedro de Alcántara, Spain. The band produced and arranged the album; Hale served as the album's keyboards and programmer, Matthewman served as the album's guitarist, programmer, woodwind player whilst Denman provided the album's bass. Mike Pela helped with the co-production of the album and its recording, Andy "Nipper" Davies served as the assistant engineer and Tom Coyne mastered Lovers Rock.

Additional help came from a variety of people. Karl Van Den Bossche supplied the album's percussion, while Nick Ingman supplied the string arrangements on the song "King of Sorrow". Andy Nice provided the cello on "Every Word" and Janusz Podrazik provided keyboards on two of the album's songs "Immigrant" and "It's Only Love That Gets You Through", additional vocals for the album came from vocalist Leroy Osbourne. The album's recording and themes were inspired by Adu's experiences during the previous decade, particularly of how she had become preoccupied with the complexity of other people's lives and extremely unhappy.

== Content ==
Lovers Rock is ironically a collection of songs made up of relatively sparse arrangements. Most of the compositions are founded on acoustic guitar with gently applied beats. With the songs intimately fixated on the themes of love, loss and rejection, her delicate phrasing, delivery and deft use of repetition often imbues a deeper meaning than the lyrics themselves suggest.

— Del F. Cowie

Unlike Sade's previous work, Lovers Rock did not contain saxophones or instrumentation, but instead spare, deceptively simple arrangement—sometimes no more than an acoustic guitar. The album's music borrowed reverb and echo effects from dub as well as an ease and fluidity, tougher beats and basslines, from R&B. Ed Hogan of AllMusic stated that Lovers Rock was the first album by the band that contained a more experimental sound with the infusion of mainstream rock elements and strummed guitars. According to Rob Sheffield of Rolling Stone, the groove on Lovers Rock is predominantly "light", with "slight reggae flourishes" appearing throughout. He noted that the songs, each lasting around five minutes, rarely vary from one another in rhythm. Del F. Cowie of Exclaim! described Lovers Rock as a collection of songs with sparse arrangements, based upon acoustic guitars with gently applied beats.

Lovers Rock was seen as offering a more stripped-down, subtle backdrop than the band's previous work, and the album's production saw the use of modern dance beats and reggae. Lovers Rock was described as a concept album by Sal Cinquemani of Slant Magazine, who stated the album was lyrically a "soundtrack for lovers, lovers who are in love and making love and lovers who have been scorned." Cinquemani also noted political themes of two of the album's songs, "Slave Song" and "Immigrant", which were noted as social statements. Lovers Rock contains a continuous composition, with each song leading to the next with a "united flow." The album's lyrics were described as being fixated on the themes of love, loss and rejection.

The album opens with the lead single "By Your Side", a hymnlike song that received comparisons to "A Whiter Shade of Pale" and "No Woman, No Cry". Lyrically, Adu insists she will never leave someone in trouble. "Flow" is sonically a mixture of folky acoustic guitar, slow-paced hip hop loops, and layered harmonies. "King of Sorrow" explores the complexities of a faltering relationship, in which Adu is torn between what she has invested and the opportunities she might be missing. "The Sweetest Gift" is an acoustic song, which is dedicated to the Rainbow Trust Children's Charity caring for children who have a life-threatening or terminal illness and their families, both in their own homes and at the Trust's two UK family respite centres. "Slave Song" is lyrically a social statement, calling for an awareness of history and the sensibility to rise above it, the song's concept is introduced through lyrics like; "Teach my beloved children who have been enslaved/To reach for the light continually." "Immigrant" is backed by hip hop beats, and explores racial tensions with lyrics including, "Coming from where he did/He was turned away from every door like Joseph/To even the strongest among us/That would be too much."

== Release and promotion ==
The album was first released in the United Kingdom on 13 November 2000. Lovers Rock was titled after the romantic strain of reggae also known as lovers rock, which Adu listened to in her youth. "By Your Side" was released as the lead single from the album and was nominated for the 2002 Grammy Award for Best Female Pop Vocal Performance, but lost out to Nelly Furtado's "I'm Like a Bird". It also placed at number 48 on VH1's list of the "100 Greatest Love Songs". The single reached number 75 on the US Billboard Hot 100 and number 17 on the UK Singles Chart. "King of Sorrow" was released as the album's second single on 12 March 2001. The song performed poorly on charts, peaking at number 59 on the UK chart and failing to impact the US Billboard Hot 100, instead reaching number one on the US Billboard Bubbling Under R&B/Hip-Hop Singles chart.

To promote the album, Sade embarked on the Lovers Rock Tour across North America, which was announced via Sade's website in April 2001. The announcement stated the tour would begin in the summer of 2001 with 30 shows. Initial dates were rescheduled due to extended rehearsal time. The shows sold well, with many stops adding additional shows. In August 2001, the tour was extended by eight weeks, due to ticket demand. Deemed by many critics as a comeback tour, it marked the band's first performance since 1994 and lasted until 2011. Although many believed the trek would expand to other countries, this never came to fruition. It became the 13th highest-grossing tour of 2001, earning $26,488,293 million and drawing 491,151 audience members to 42 concerts.

Following the tour, Sade released their first live album, Lovers Live, on 5 February 2002 by Epic Records. Lovers Live reached number 10 on the US Billboard 200 and number 51 on the UK Albums Chart, Sade's first album to miss the top 20 in the UK. The album was certified gold by the RIAA on 7 March 2002, having sold 562,000 copies in the US, while the DVD was certified platinum on 30 January 2003 for shipments in excess of 100,000 copies.

== Critical reception ==
Professional ratings
Aggregate scores
Source	Rating
Metacritic	78/100
Review scores
Source	Rating
AllMusic	3.5/5 stars
Entertainment Weekly	B
The Guardian	4/5 stars
Mixmag	5/5
NME	7/10
Pitchfork	8.7/10
Q	3/5 stars
Rolling Stone	3.5/5 stars
Spin	8/10
USA Today	4/4 stars

Upon release, Lovers Rock received generally positive reviews from music critics. At Metacritic, which assigns a normalised rating out of 100 to reviews from mainstream publications, the album received an average score of 78, based on 11 reviews. Ed Hogan of AllMusic praised Sade's choice to infuse "more mainstream rock elements (prominent strummed guitars) into her music." Michael Paoletta of Billboard described the album as "sterling" and "signature Sade". James Hannaham of Spin found Lovers Rock "demo-like in its simplicity" and praised its "airy" tones, dubbing the album "ephemeral". In a review for Rolling Stone, Rob Sheffield wrote that the album "sounds exactly like Sade, heavily influenced by Diamond Life with a bit of Love Deluxe thrown in. Needless to say, it's also pretty damn good, because this smooth operator shrewdly sticks to the tricks she'd already mastered before turning pro."

Yahoo! Music UK critic Cyd Jaymes also gave the album a positive review, stating, "Back with the same band that helped her notch up such smoky, smooth jazz hits as 'Your Love Is King', 'Smooth Operator' and 'The Sweetest Taboo', Sade has produced an album of class, sophistication and melancholy soul." Ken Tucker of Entertainment Weekly praised the album's cohesiveness, saying each "song melts into the next; the result is an undifferentiated dreaminess." In a more mixed review, Q considered Lovers Rock less memorable than Sade's "past triumphs", but highlighted the "refined ache and minimalist chic" of certain songs. Revolution said that the band had not taken "a gigantic creative leap forward", assessing Lovers Rock as an "acceptable soul album for the adoring Sade fan". On 27 February 2002, the album earned Sade the Grammy Award for Best Pop Vocal Album.

== Commercial performance ==
Lovers Rock debuted at number 18 on the UK Albums Chart, selling 28,245 copies in its first week. The album had sold 325,363 copies in the United Kingdom as of February 2010, and was certified platinum by the British Phonographic Industry (BPI) on 22 July 2013. Lovers Rock debuted at number three on the Billboard 200 with 370,000 copies sold in its first week, marking the largest first-week sales of 2000 by a British artist in the United States. It spent 58 weeks on the chart, and went on to become the 14th best-selling album of 2001 in the US and the 109th best-selling album of the 2000s decade. On 18 July 2001, it was certified triple platinum by the RIAA, and had sold 3.9 million copies in the United States by February 2010. The album also peaked at number two on Billboard's Top R&B/Hip-Hop Albums chart, as well as number 13 on the Canadian Albums Chart, where it was later certified double platinum by the Canadian Recording Industry Association (CRIA).

== Track listing ==
All tracks are written by Sade Adu, Stuart Matthewman, Andrew Hale and Paul S. Denman, except where noted.

No.	Title	Writer(s)	Length
1.	"By Your Side"		4:34
2.	"Flow"		4:34
3.	"King of Sorrow"		4:53
4.	"Somebody Already Broke My Heart"		5:01
5.	"All About Our Love"		2:40
6.	"Slave Song"		4:12
7.	"The Sweetest Gift"		2:18
8.	"Every Word"		4:04
9.	"Immigrant"	Adu; Janusz Podrazik	3:48
10.	"Lovers Rock"		4:13
11.	"It's Only Love That Gets You Through"	Adu; Podrazik	3:53
Total length:			44:10

Target limited edition bonus disc
No.	Title	Length
1.	"The Sweetest Taboo" (live)	5:55
2.	"Smooth Operator" (live)	4:55
3.	"Nothing Can Come Between Us" (live)	4:46
4.	"No Ordinary Love" (live)	8:12
Total length:		23:48

== Personnel ==
Credits adapted from the liner notes of Lovers Rock.

=== Sade ===
- Sade Adu – vocals
- Andrew Hale – keyboards, programming
- Stuart Matthewman – guitars, woodwinds, programming
- Paul S. Denman – bass

=== Additional musicians ===
- Leroy Osbourne – vocals
- Karl Van Den Bossche – percussion
- Janusz Podrazik – keyboards on "Immigrant" and "It's Only Love That Gets You Through"
- Andy Nice – cello on "Every Word"
- Nick Ingman – string arrangement on "King of Sorrow"

=== Technical ===
- Sade – production, arrangement
- Mike Pela – co-production, recording
- Andy "Nipper" Davies – engineering assistance
- Tom Coyne – mastering

=== Artwork ===
- Albert Watson – cover photography, all other photographs
- Sophie Muller – cover photography
- Melissa Caplan – Sade inside photograph
- Intro – design

== Charts ==
=== Weekly charts ===
Weekly chart performance for Lovers Rock
Chart (2000–2026)	Peak position
Australian Albums (ARIA)	28
Australian Urban Albums (ARIA)	4
Austrian Albums (Ö3 Austria)	5
Belgian Albums (Ultratop Flanders)	16
Belgian Albums (Ultratop Wallonia)	10
Canadian Albums (Billboard)	13
Canadian R&B Albums (Nielsen SoundScan)	2
Danish Albums (Hitlisten)	7
Dutch Albums (Album Top 100)	20
European Albums (Billboard)	4
Finnish Albums (Suomen virallinen lista)	9
French Albums (SNEP)	4
German Albums (Offizielle Top 100)	4
Greek Albums (IFPI Greece)	4
Hungarian Albums (MAHASZ)	8
Irish Albums (IRMA)	26
Italian Albums (FIMI)	4
Japanese Albums (Oricon)	14
New Zealand Albums (RMNZ)	26
Norwegian Albums (VG-lista)	5
Polish Albums (ZPAV)	1
Portuguese Albums (AFP)	5
Scottish Albums (Official Charts)	31
Spanish Albums (AFYVE)	6
Swedish Albums (Sverigetopplistan)	2
Swiss Albums (Schweizer Hitparade)	6
UK Albums (Official Charts)	18
UK Jazz & Blues Albums (Official Charts)	3
UK R&B Albums (Official Charts)	3
US Billboard 200	3
US Top R&B/Hip-Hop Albums (Billboard)	2

=== Year-end charts ===
2000 year-end chart performance for Lovers Rock
Chart (2000)	Position
Belgian Albums (Ultratop Wallonia)	86
Canadian Albums (Nielsen SoundScan)	114
Danish Albums (Hitlisten)	51
French Albums (SNEP)	44
Italian Albums (FIMI)	30
Swiss Albums (Schweizer Hitparade)	83
UK Albums (OCC)	75

2001 year-end chart performance for Lovers Rock
Chart (2001)	Position
Austrian Albums (Ö3 Austria)	41
Belgian Albums (Ultratop Wallonia)	44
Canadian Albums (Nielsen SoundScan)	63
Canadian R&B Albums (Nielsen SoundScan)	12
Dutch Albums (Album Top 100)	64
European Albums (Music & Media)	27
French Albums (SNEP)	115
German Albums (Offizielle Top 100)	60
Spanish Albums (AFYVE)	49
Swedish Albums (Sverigetopplistan)	29
Swiss Albums (Schweizer Hitparade)	83
UK Albums (OCC)	177
US Billboard 200	14
US Top R&B/Hip-Hop Albums (Billboard)	5

2002 year-end chart performance for Lovers Rock
Chart (2002)	Position
Canadian R&B Albums (Nielsen SoundScan)	92

=== Decade-end charts ===
Decade-end chart performance for Lovers Rock
Chart (2000–2009)	Position
US Billboard 200	109

== Certifications and sales ==
Certifications and sales for Lovers Rock
Region	Certification	Certified units/sales
Australia (ARIA)	Gold	35,000^{^}
Austria (IFPI Austria)	Gold	25,000^{*}
Belgium (BRMA)	Gold	25,000^{*}
Brazil (Pro-Música Brasil)	Gold	100,000^{*}
Canada (Music Canada)	2× Platinum	200,000^{^}
Denmark (IFPI Danmark)	Gold	25,000^{^}
France (SNEP)	2× Gold	200,000^{*}
Germany (BVMI)	Platinum	300,000^{^}
Italy (FIMI)	3× Platinum	300,000^{*}
Japan (RIAJ)	Gold	100,000^{^}
Netherlands (NVPI)	Gold	40,000^{^}
New Zealand (RMNZ)	Gold	7,500^{^}
Norway (IFPI Norway)	Gold	25,000^{*}
Poland (ZPAV)	Platinum	70,000^{*}
Spain (Promusicae)	Platinum	100,000^{^}
Sweden (GLF)	Platinum	80,000^{^}
Switzerland (IFPI Switzerland)	Gold	25,000^{^}
United Kingdom (BPI)	Platinum	325,363
United States (RIAA)	3× Platinum	3,900,000
Summaries
Europe (IFPI)	Platinum	1,000,000^{*}
Worldwide	—	6,000,000
^{*} Sales figures based on certification alone.^{^} Shipments figures based on certification alone.

== See also ==
- List of number-one albums of 2000 (Poland)
