= Cherish the Day =

1993 single by Sade

Single by Sade

from the album Love Deluxe
- B-side: "Bullet Proof Soul"
- Released: 19 July 1993
- Genre: Trip hop; funk; ambient-soul
- Length: 5:32
- Label: Epic
- Songwriters: Sade Adu; Andrew Hale; Stuart Matthewman
- Producer: Sade

Sade singles chronology
"Kiss of Life" (1993)	"Cherish the Day" (1993)	"By Your Side" (2000)

Music video
- "Cherish the Day" on YouTube

"Cherish the Day" is a song by English band Sade from their fourth studio album, Love Deluxe (1992). It was released as the album's fourth and final single in the United Kingdom on 19 July 1993. The song was written and produced by Sade, followed by the co-writers Andrew Hale, and Stuart Matthewman.

== Critical reception ==
Justin Chadwick from Albumism described the song as "soaring", adding that "a wistful Adu sings of finding a love so supreme that nothing in this life or beyond can ever compete". Tanya Rena Jefferson of AXS stated, "This joyous soulful song embraces one to cherish each and every day." Troy J. Augusto from Cashbox said it "sports Sade's usual understated musical arrangement, allowing the lead vocals, even as laid back as they are, to be the centerpiece of the song." The Daily Vault's Mark Millan called it "enchanting", adding it as "one of the album's finest moments as the guys offer a minimal but lush track for Adu to weave her tale of the ultimate love, all the while finally exploring her considerable vocal range." Ron Fell from the Gavin Report noted that "the sweet surrender" of the song is "timeless and classic Sade and could have come from any of her previous three volumes of platinum cool."

Sophie Heawood of The Guardian commented "The band at their most abstractly evocative: at their best, they could do a remarkable amount with very little – as proved by this song, during which immense yearning is conveyed." Pan-European magazine Music & Media wrote, "Despite the artwork, showing Sade with a guitar and a stack of speakers in the background, she hasn't rocked up her sound. On the contrary, with a lonely drum track on a synth carpet, 'ambient soul' is within reach." James Hamilton from Music Week's RM Dance Update described it as a "lovely languid tranquil smoocher". Frank Guan of Vulture added, "Her minimalist lyrics... say all that needs to be said, and once a ten-note bassline jumps in to underscore her depth of feeling over the misty synths, the song is perfect and complete."

== Music video ==
Filmed in black and white by Derek M. Allen, the music video for "Cherish the Day" was directed by Albert Watson, and features Sade Adu performing the song whilst playing the guitar on the rooftop of a New York City skyscraper (101 Park Ave) as her bandmates and a few other people vibe to the music on the streets below.

== In popular culture ==
The song title was used for the title of the American television series Cherish the Day.

Sudan Archives performed a cover of the song on SiriusXMU in March 2026.

== Track listings ==
- UK, European and Japanese CD single
1. "Cherish the Day" (Sade remix short version) – 5:18
2. "Cherish the Day" (Sade remix long version) – 6:18
3. "Cherish the Day" (Ronin remix) – 6:58
4. "Cherish the Day" (Pal Joey remix) – 6:46
- US CD single
1. "Cherish the Day" (Sade remix) – 6:18
2. "Cherish the Day" (Ronin remix) – 6:58
3. "Cherish the Day" (Pal Joey remix) – 6:46
4. "Feel No Pain" (Nellee Hooper remix) – 5:09
5. "No Ordinary Love" (album version) – 7:18
- Australian CD single and US cassette single
1. "Cherish the Day" (Sade remix) – 6:18
2. "Cherish the Day" (Ronin remix) – 6:58
3. "Cherish the Day" (Pal Joey remix) – 6:46
- UK and Dutch 12-inch single

A1. "Cherish the Day" (Sade remix long version) – 6:18
A2. "Cherish the Day" (Ronin remix) – 6:58
B1. "Cherish the Day" (Pal Joey remix) – 6:46
B2. "Cherish the Day" (Sade remix short version) – 5:18

- US limited-edition 12-inch single

A1. "Cherish the Day" (Sade remix long version) – 6:18
A2. "Cherish the Day" (Ronin remix) – 6:58
B1. "Cherish the Day" (Pal Joey remix) – 6:46
B2. "Feel No Pain" (Nellee Hooper remix) – 5:09
B3. "No Ordinary Love" (album edit) – 5:23

- US 7-inch single

A1. "Cherish the Day" (Sade remix short version) – 5:18
A2. "Cherish the Day" (Ronin remix) – 6:58

== Charts ==
Chart performance for "Cherish the Day"
Chart (1993)	Peak position
UK Singles (OCC)	53
UK Dance (Music Week)	17
US Bubbling Under Hot 100 (Billboard)	16
US Dance Singles Sales (Billboard)	23
US Hot R&B/Hip-Hop Songs (Billboard)	45
US Top 100 R&B Singles (Cash Box)	40
