= Mike Pela =

British music producer (1950–2022)

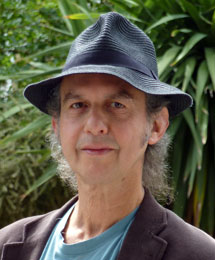
- Born: 13 January 1950; London, England
- Died: 23 July 2022 (aged 72); Italy

Mike Pela (13 January 1950 – 23 July 2022) was a British record producer and mixer. He worked with various artists including Sade, Maxwell, Savage Garden and others, spanning a wide array of genres.

== Career ==
Pela started his career in the 1970s working at the CTS / De Lane Lea recording complex in London. He worked on many projects during this time including The Who's Tommy and the Electric Light Orchestra's Eldorado. He then went into a freelance role where he worked with artists such as Alice Cooper, Stephen Stills, Hawkwind, Nico, and Pete Townshend. In the 1980s he worked out of Robin Millar's Power Plant studios, where he was able to participate in music projects featuring artists such as Boy George, Fine Young Cannibals, Everything but the Girl, Tom Robinson, The Style Council, Gang of Four and Sade.

Pela won several Grammy Awards, including: 2010 Best R&B Performance by a Duo or Group with Vocal for Sade's "Soldier of Love", 2009 Best R&B Album for Maxwell's BLACKsummers'night and Best Male R&B Vocal Performance for Maxwell's "Pretty Wings", 2002 Best Pop Vocal Album for Sade's Lovers Rock, and 1993 Best R&B Performance by a Duo or Group with Vocal for Sade's "No Ordinary Love".
