= Sade (band) =

British band

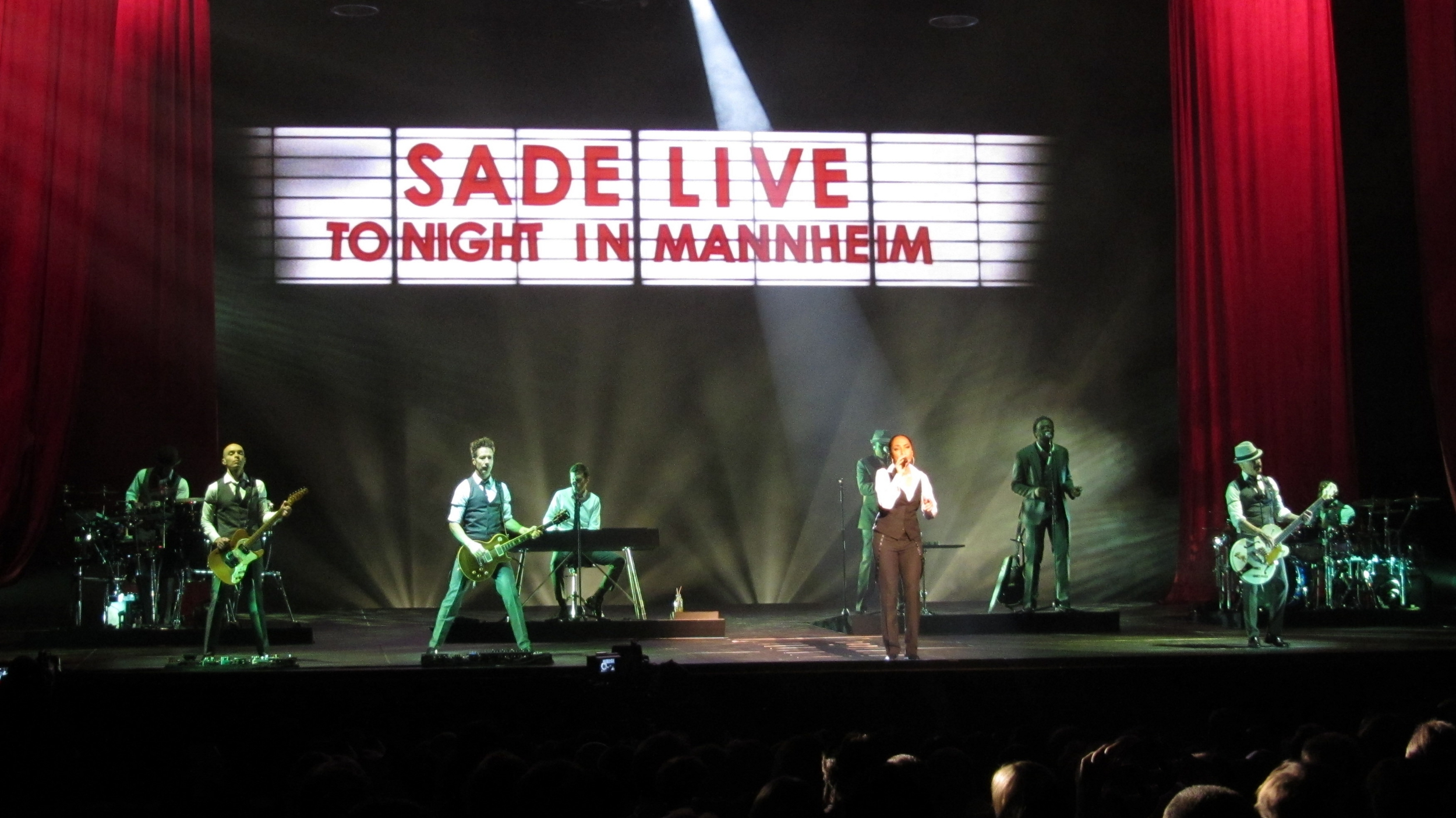
- Sade in 2011

Background information
- Origin: London, England
- Genres: Smooth jazz; sophisti-pop; R&B; soul; progressive soul
- Years active: 1982–present
- Labels: Epic; Portrait; RCA; Sony
- Spinoff of: Pride
- Members: Sade Adu; Paul Denman; Andrew Hale; Stuart Matthewman
- Past members: Paul Anthony Cooke; Dave Early
- Website: sade.com

Sade (/ˈʃɑːdeɪ/ SHAH-day or /ʃɑːˈdeɪ/ shah-DAY) are an English band, formed in London in 1982. It comprises Sade Adu (vocals), Paul Denman (bass), Stuart Matthewman (saxophones, guitars) and Andrew Hale (keyboards, piano); the band has not had a drummer since 1986, and employs session musicians for recordings and live shows. Their style spans genres such as soul, quiet storm, smooth jazz and sophisti-pop.

Sade's debut studio album, Diamond Life (1984), topped the charts of several countries, sold over four million copies worldwide, and won the Brit Award for Best British Album. Their second studio album, Promise (1985), was certified double platinum in the UK, and quadruple platinum in the US, peaking at number one in both territories; it also won the band their first Grammy Award. Their following two albums, Stronger Than Pride (1988) and Love Deluxe (1992), drew further success and awards. They released their fifth studio album 8 years later with Lovers Rock (2000), which won the Grammy Award for Best Pop Vocal Album. Ten years after that, their sixth studio album, Soldier of Love (2010), became their first number one debut in the US, and their first number one overall since Promise; it won the band its fourth Grammy for Best R&B Performance by a Duo or Group with Vocals.

All of Sade's albums, including compilations and a live album, have charted in the US Top Ten. As of 2012, their sales in the US stood at 23 million units, and by 2014, their sales worldwide stood at 75 million. The band was ranked at number 50 on VH1's list of the "100 Greatest Artists of All Time" and inducted in the Rock and Roll Hall of Fame in 2026.

== History ==
=== 1980s ===
The musical group Sade was formed in London in 1982, by members of the Latin soul band Pride. Sade Adu, Stuart Matthewman (sax), Paul Denman (bass), and Paul Anthony Cooke (drums), formed the break-away group and began to write its material. They named the band after lead singer Sade Adu, and made their debut performance in December 1982 at Ronnie Scott's Club in London in support of Pride. In May 1983, the band performed its first US show at Danceteria in New York City. Andrew Hale joined on keyboards in mid-1983; Cooke was replaced on drums by Dave Early in early 1984.

Sade received more attention from the media and record companies than Pride had, and eventually separated from that group altogether. On 18 October 1983, the singer signed with CBS Records (which was absorbed by its parent label, Epic Records, in 1986). As singer and band established themselves, Epic Records printed "Pronounced Shar-day" on the record labels of the band's releases, which led to mispronunciation in rhotic North American accents.

In February 1984, Sade released its first single, "Your Love Is King", which became a Top Ten hit. A second single, "When Am I Going to Make a Living" barely made the Top 40, but the band's debut album, Diamond Life, was released in July 1984 and peaked at No. 2. It spent over six months in the UK Top Ten and was later certified 4× platinum by the BPI. Diamond Life won the 1985 Brit Award for Best British Album, and was later included in the book 1001 Albums You Must Hear Before You Die.

The band embarked on its first major UK tour, augmented by Dave Early (drums), Martin Ditcham (percussion), Terry Bailey (trumpet) and Gordon Matthewman (trombone). A third single, "Smooth Operator", was released from the album with a video directed by Julien Temple. The single became its first US hit in spring 1985, propelling the album in the US Top Ten. Also in 1985, the band were nominated for two MTV Video Music Awards—"Best Female Video" and "Best New Artist".

On 13 July 1985, Sade performed at the Live Aid at Wembley Stadium in London. Sade Adu became the only African-born artist to appear in front of the live audience of 75,000 and an estimated worldwide television audience of 1.4 billion in 170 countries.

In late 1985, Sade released its second album, Promise, which peaked at No. 1 in both the UK and the US. It was certified double platinum by the BPI in the UK, and quadruple platinum in the US. In 1986, Adu was nominated for an American Music Awards for Favorite Soul/R&B Female Video Artist, and the band won a Grammy Award for Best New Artist. On 28 June 1986, after touring for the album, the band performed at the Artists Against Apartheid Concert in the Freedom Festival on Clapham Common in London. In 1987 the band was nominated for a Grammy Award for Best R&B Vocal Performance by a Duo or Group for Promise.

Sade's third album, Stronger Than Pride, was released in May 1988. The album peaked at No. 3 in the UK and has been certified platinum by the BPI. It was preceded by the single "Paradise", which made the UK Top 30 and US Top 20. The band toured across the world again, augmented by Blair Cunningham (drums), Martin Ditcham (percussion), Leroy Osbourne (vocals), Gordon Hunte (guitar), James McMillan (trumpet) and Jake Jacas (trombone & vocals). In 1989, Sade Adu was nominated for an American Music Award for Favorite Soul/R&B Female Artist.

=== 1990s ===
Sade's fourth album, Love Deluxe, was released in November 1992. The album peaked at No. 3 on the US Album charts and was certified quadruple-Platinum, and peaked at No. 10 in the UK and was certified Gold by the BPI.

In 1993, the band recorded a cover of the Percy Mayfield song, "Please Send Me Someone to Love", for the Academy Award-winning film Philadelphia, before launching the Love Deluxe world tour. Joining the band were Leroy Osbourne (vocals), Gordon Hunte (guitar), Trevor Murrell (drums), Karl Vanden Bossche (percussion), and Rick Braun (trumpet).

The 1994 Grammy for Best R&B Performance by a Duo or Group was awarded to Sade for "No Ordinary Love", featured in the 1993 film Indecent Proposal. In November the group released its first compilation album, The Best of Sade. The album was another Top Ten hit in both the UK and US and was certified Platinum and Quadruple-Platinum respectively. In 1996 Hale, Denman, and Matthewman formed their own band as a side project, Sweetback, and released a self-titled album.

=== 2000s ===
In October 2000, Sade Adu came out of retirement to perform at the prestigious MOBO Awards, her first live performance in several years. The following month, Sade released its fifth studio album, Lovers Rock, its first album in eight years. The album peaked at number 18 in the UK (its only studio album not to make the top 10) though was certified Gold by the BPI. It fared better in the US, peaking at number 3. It also won the Grammy Award for Best Pop Vocal Album in 2002. The band toured the US throughout 2001. The tour resulted in a live album, Lovers Live, which was released in the UK and US in February 2002. In 2005 the band contributed the track "Mum" to the Voices for Darfur DVD.

=== 2010s ===
In mid-2009, an official-looking website (sade2009.com) posted that an upcoming Sade album would be released on 24 November 2009 before Sony Music released any news or marketing for an upcoming album. However, Sony denied having any affiliation with the site. Billboard Charts contacted the site's owner to confirm the release date and was told the date was official, but soon after, the date was removed.

Sade fans discovered that the registered owner of the site was Thomas Roman, a web developer, freelance digital marketing and SEO specialist. Roman utilized the buzz around the album's release to drive traffic to his website and earn money on pay per click advertisements. To date it is not known how he predicted a date so close to the actual release of their first single and studio album in a decade.

Sade's sixth studio album Soldier of Love was released worldwide on 8 February 2010, the band's first album of new material in ten years. Following the release of the "Soldier of Love" single on 8 December 2009, the track debuted at number 11 on the Urban Hot AC chart, making it the highest debut of the decade and the third-highest all-time on the Urban Hot AC chart. "Soldier of Love" debuted at number 5 on the Smooth Jazz airplay chart and became the first-ever vocal to hit number 1 on the Smooth Jazz Top 20 Countdown.

The album peaked at No. 4 in the UK. In the US the album sold 502,000 copies in its first week and topped the Billboard 200 chart. The album stayed at No. 1 in the US for three weeks. The group released the second single from the album, "Babyfather", in April 2010, followed by a video in May. On 13 April 2010, the band performed "Babyfather" and "The Sweetest Taboo" on the US TV show Dancing With The Stars. In September 2010 the group announced the first dates of its global tour, Sade Live, to begin in April 2011.

In 2011, Sade received its fourth Grammy Award (Best R&B Performance by a Duo or Group with Vocals) for Soldier of Love, and released a second greatest hits album, The Ultimate Collection, which made the UK Top Ten. A new video for the track "Love Is Found" premiered in July 2011.

The band returned in 2018 for the soundtrack to the Disney film A Wrinkle in Time with the song "Flower of the Universe" and for the song "The Big Unknown" for the motion picture Widows.

On 13 July 2018, Sade bandmate Stuart Matthewman told Rated R&B in an interview that the band is in the studio working on its seventh studio album. He said, "We're working on a new album. When we're happy, then we'll let everyone else hear it."

=== 2020s ===
A remastered vinyl boxset of Sade's six albums, titled This Far, was released on 9 October 2020. Their engineer and co-producer, Mike Pela, died in 2022. The band reportedly began recording new material for a seventh album in the summer 2022 at the rebuilt Miraval Studios (where they previously recorded Promise and Stronger Than Pride).

== Band members ==
- Sade Adu – lead vocals, programming (1982–present)
- Paul S. Denman – bass guitar (1982–present)
- Andrew Hale – keyboards, piano, programming (1982–present)
- Stuart Matthewman – saxophone, guitars, programming (1982–present)

Former members

- Paul Anthony Cooke – drums, percussion (1982–1984)
- Dave Early – drums, percussion (1984–1985, died 1996)

=== Sweetback ===
Sweetback are an English band composed of members from the band Sade, excluding the frontwoman, Sade Adu. They are a jazz/funk band with R&B overtones. Membership includes Stuart Matthewman, Paul Denman, and Andrew Hale.

The group was formed in 1994 at the conclusion of Sade's Love Deluxe World Tour. They released two studio albums: Sweetback (1996) and Stage 2 (2004). Their albums feature a host of guest vocalists, such as Leroy Osbourne, Amel Larrieux, Maxwell, Aya (Lysa Aya Trenier), Bahamadia, Chocolate Genius and El DeBarge. Their first album was re-released on vinyl in 2016.

== Legacy ==
The band are credited with influencing the musical genre of neo soul and achieving success in the 1980s with songs that featured a sophisti-pop style, incorporating elements of soul, pop, smooth jazz and quiet storm. The band were part of a new wave of British R&B-oriented artists during the late-1980s and early-1990s that also included artists Soul II Soul, Caron Wheeler, The Brand New Heavies, Simply Red, Jamiroquai and Lisa Stansfield. AllMusic's Alex Henderson writes that, "Many of the British artists who emerged during that period had a neo-soul outlook and were able to blend influences from different eras". Following the coining of the term "quiet storm" by Smokey Robinson, Sade were credited for helping give the genre a worldwide audience.

The band's work has influenced and been recognized by several musical artists. Rapper Rakim of Eric B. & Rakim stated he grew up listening to Sade's music and was influenced by the singer's voice and style. Rakim has also referenced its song "Smooth Operator" in his rap song "Paid in Full" (1987). Hip hop group Souls of Mischief stated they grew up listening to Sade's music. Hip hop group Tanya Morgan also described Sade as one of its favorite artists.

Frontman Chino Moreno of the alternative metal band Deftones has cited Love Deluxe as one of his top 13 favorite albums. In an interview with The Quietus, Moreno said, "I've always loved it, it was a big inspiration on me. It's sort of classy, another cocktail and cityscape record." The band also covered the lead single "No Ordinary Love" in collaboration with singer Jonah Matranga for the band's 2005 compilation album, B-Sides & Rarities.

Singer Keri Hilson said, "My Dad would whistle Sade melodies randomly all the time. As a kid, I used to try to whistle along to 'Cherish the Day' or 'The Sweetest Taboo.' He was a real Sade fan and made me one, too!" In reaction to the newly released album Soldier of Love, rapper Kanye West wrote, "This is why i still have a blog. To be a part of moments like this ... new Sade ... How much better this ... than everything else?". Rapper Rick Ross stated in an interview that "People may know my infatuation with Sade. There's never been a bad Sade track. I love all different sides."

The group were inducted to the Rock and Roll Hall of Fame in 2026.

== Discography ==
- Diamond Life (1984)
- Promise (1985)
- Stronger Than Pride (1988)
- Love Deluxe (1992)
- Lovers Rock (2000)
- Soldier of Love (2010)

== Tours ==
- Diamond Life Tour (1984)
- Promise Tour (1985–1986)
- Stronger Than Pride Tour (1988)
- Love Deluxe World Tour (1993)
- Lovers Rock Tour (2001)
- Sade Live (2011)
