= Stuart Matthewman =

English songwriter and record producer (born 1960)

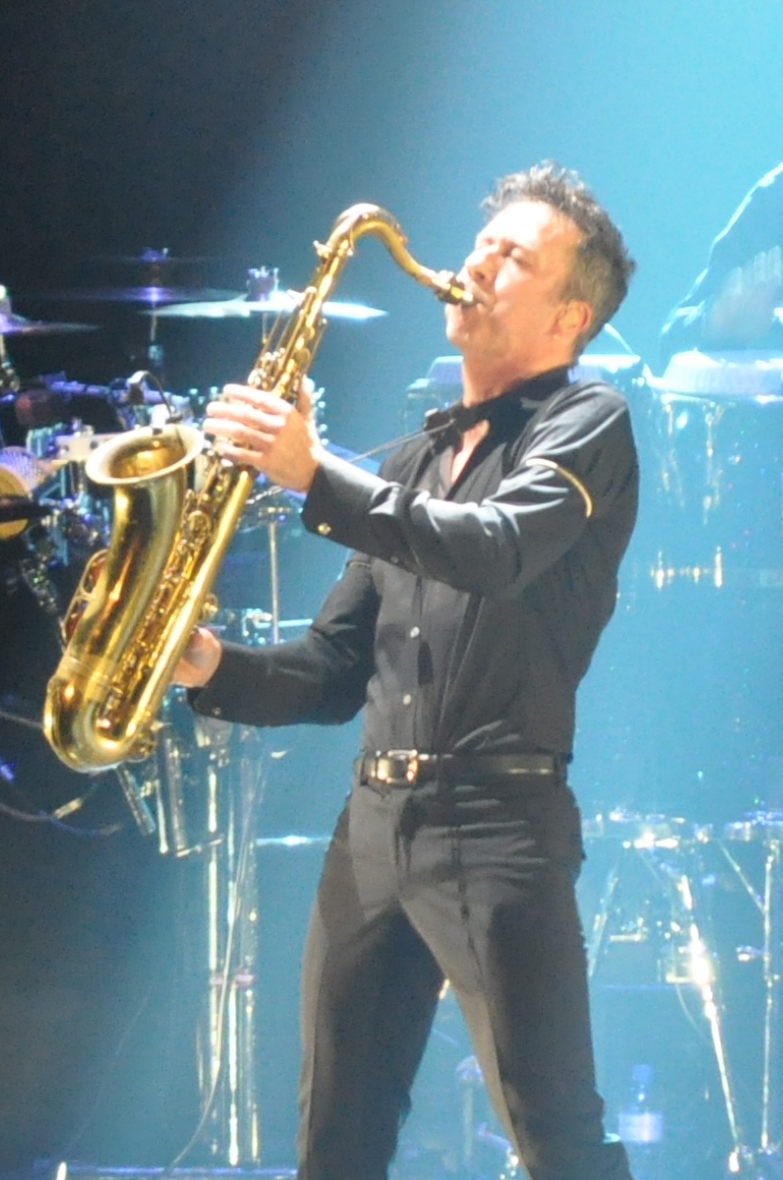
- Matthewman in 2011

Background information
- Also known as: Cottonbelly
- Born: 18 August 1960 (age 66); Hull, East Riding of Yorkshire, England
- Genres: Downtempo; chill-out; dub; acid jazz; space age pop
- Occupations: Songwriter; record producer; musician
- Instruments: Saxophone; guitar; keyboards
- Years active: 1982–present
- Website: stuartmatthewman.com

Stuart Colin Matthewman, also known as Cottonbelly, is an English songwriter, record producer and musician. He is best known as the guitarist and saxophonist of the band Sade. His work as a member of Sade has earned him four Grammy Awards and a Rock and Roll Hall of Fame nomination in 2024. Alongside the rest of the band, Matthewman was inducted into the Hall of Fame in 2026. Matthewman has also worked extensively with Maxwell, co-producing the majority of his albums. Additionally, he is also a member of Sweetback.

== Early life and career ==
Matthewman was born in Hull, East Riding of Yorkshire. In 1982, he relocated to London.

Joining Latin funk band Pride, Matthewman met singer Sade Adu and they began writing songs together. Teaming with bassist Paul S. Denman and keyboardist Andrew Hale, they formed the band Sade. Sade signed with Epic Records in 1984. In addition to songwriting, Matthewman can be heard on saxophone, guitar, keyboards, and programming. He appeared on all of Sade's tours and albums: Diamond Life, Promise, Stronger Than Pride, Love Deluxe, Lovers Rock, and Soldier of Love all of which went triple platinum in the U.S. and have totalled sales over 40 million albums worldwide.

In 1995, percussionist Karl Vanden Bossche introduced Matthewman to then unknown singer Maxwell. Matthewman co-produced, co-wrote, and played saxophone and guitar on Maxwell's albums: Maxwell's Urban Hang Suite (Columbia, 1996), Embrya (Columbia, 1998), Now (Columbia, 2001) and blackSUMMERS'night (Columbia, 2016).

In 1996, Matthewman along with Andrew Hale and Paul Spencer Denman formed the studio band Sweetback. Their work featured instrumental songs and songs with guest vocalists. They released two albums, Sweetback (1996) and Stage 2 (2004).

Matthewman co-wrote, performed, and produced tracks on Santessa's 2000 trip-hop album, Delirium, released on Sony.

Using the pseudonym Cottonbelly, Matthewman released the dub/electronic album, X Amounts of Niceness in 2010 and produced remixes for artists.

Working with Paloma Faith on her third studio album, Matthewman co-wrote two songs on her album A Perfect Contradiction released March 2014. In an interview with Pete Lewis for Blues and Soul print magazine, issue 1098, Paloma Faith discusses working with songwriters: "another person I really clicked with was Stuart Matthewman, who is Sade's co-writer. Basically I found him very easy to work with because to me he is really like a beautiful facilitator. In that I could just hum something to him and, though it could seem like a really shoddy idea, he would somehow immediately just play the right chords that would make it sound like something really special. So yeah, I think working with Stuart was actually one of the best co-writing experiences I've ever HAD - just because he works in very simple ways".

Matthewman was also a member of the group Twin Danger, formed in 2011 with singer/writer Vanessa Bley, daughter of late jazz pianist Paul Bley and pioneer video artist Carol Goss. In 2014, Twin Danger signed to Decca Classics/Universal records and released their eponymously titled album in spring 2015. Vanessa Bley was killed in a car crash on 25 October 2019 in California.

In 1996, Matthewman composed music for the short movie Bajo del Perro by Los Angeles based film makers Mike Polish and Mark Polish. He went on to compose the music scores for various films; with Maxwell music for the short film To Be A Black Man (1997), and Twin Falls Idaho (1999), Jackpot (2001), Northfork (2003), The Double (2005), The Astronaut Farmer (2006), Life Support (2007), The Smell of Success (2009), Nona (2017) and short Erotic Dreams of the Chelsea Hotel (2017).

Matthewman has discussed diverse musical influences including Junior Walker, King Curtis, Art Pepper, Ernie Isley, Steve Jones, Wah Wah Watson, Issac Hayes, Bill Withers, Lee Perry, Tony Iommi and Gustav Mahler.
