= Paul Denman =

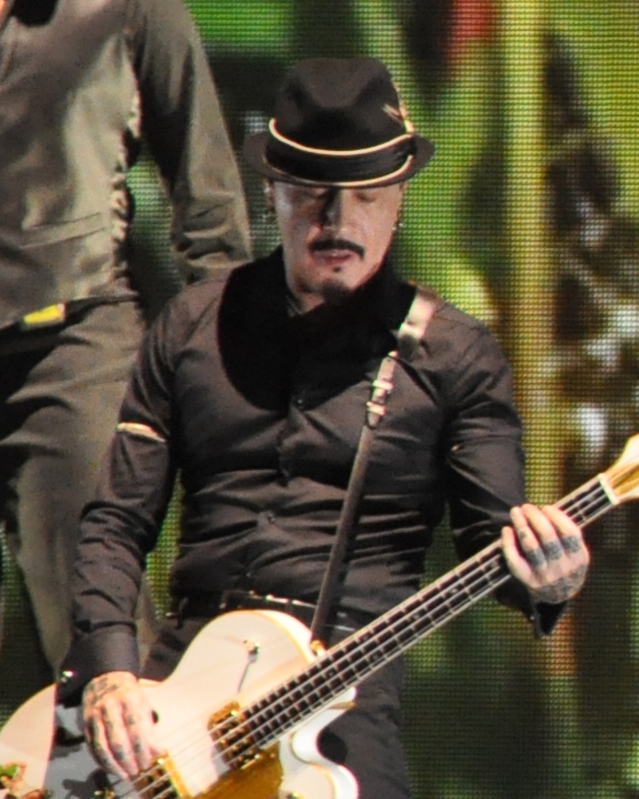
- Denman in 2011

Background information
- Born: 29 July 1957 (age 69); Hull, East Riding of Yorkshire, England
- Instrument: Bass guitar
- Years active: 1980s–present

Paul Spencer Denman (born 29 July 1957) is an English songwriter and musician. With Sade, Andrew Hale, and Stuart Matthewman, Denman gained worldwide fame as the bass guitarist of the English band Sade. He is also a member of the English band Sweetback. In 2026, Denman, along with the rest of the band, will be inducted into the Rock and Roll Hall of Fame. They were nominated previously in 2024.

== Early life ==
Born in Hull, Paul Spencer Denman is the son of Ethel Denman. From 1959 to 1979, he lived on Greatfield Estate, Kingston upon Hull, East Riding of Yorkshire, England, where Mick Ronson also grew up. Denman later noted that he shared Ronson's early ambition to leave their hometown to establish a career in the music industry.

In 1970, at the age of 13, Denman received his first bass guitar from his parents, teaching himself the instrument by playing along to records by David Bowie and other contemporary rock artists.

Denman was educated at Greatfield Senior High School. He left school at the age of 15 after achieving three O‑Level and several CSEs. He then became an apprentice in fabricating metal aircraft components at Hawker Siddeley (HS). The HS became British Aerospace (BA) and he was with the BA for five years; becoming a certified coppersmith. In a 1993 interview he credited his dexterity in playing the guitar partially to his training in metalwork.

Denman performed with local bands in the Hull music scene, including an early local trio showcased in 1977 - but driven by economic conditions in the North and desire to be part of the music scene in London, he moved to London in 1981, eventually joining Latin / funk / post-punk band Pride, which then evolved into the creation of the band Sade.

== Career ==
Denman is a right-handed bass player and rarely uses guitar picks. He often plays a MusicMan Stingray Bass with natural finish from 1978.

=== Pride ===
He was a member of the band Pride from 1981 to 1983, a creative Latin/Funk collection of seven musicians with diverse influences. The band comprised Nick Moxsom, Ray Saint John, Stuart Matthewman, Paul Anthony Cooke, Barbara Robinson, and Sade Adu. They had several notable performances beginning in 1982, including playing on a back of a lorry outside Le Beat Route in London and a performance at Danceteria, New York.

=== Sweetback ===
Sweetback was founded as a spinoff from Sade, including Stuart Matthewman, Andrew Hale, and Paul Denman with various guest vocalists. Their first album, Sweetback, was released October 1996. Their second album, Stage 2, was released on 22 June 2004.

== Personal life ==
Denman has two children, including Joe Dexter, lead singer of the band Orange.
