= Greatest Hits, Vol. 1 (Rare Essence album) =

Greatest hits album by Rare Essence
- Released: December 12, 1995
- Studio: Sigma Sound, Philadelphia, Pennsylvania; Bias Studios
- Genre: Go-go; hip-hop; funk
- Length: 54:25
- Label: Sounds of the Capital
- Producer: Jim Robeson; Peter Humphreys

Rare Essence chronology
| So What You Want? (1995) | Greatest Hits, Vol. 1 (1995) | Get Your Freak On (1995) |

Professional ratings
Review scores
| Source | Rating |
|---|---|
| AllMusic | 4/5 stars |
| The Washington Post | (favorable) |

Greatest Hits, Vol. 1 (also titled as The Essence of Rare Essence: Greatest Hits Vol. 1) is a greatest hits album by Washington, D.C.–based go-go band Rare Essence. The album was released on December 12, 1995, and consist of a compilation of ten songs from their previously released studio and live albums, including "Work the Walls", "Do the Mickey", "Body Moves", and "Do You Know What Time It Is".

== Track listing ==
| No. | Title | Writer(s) | Length |
|---|---|---|---|
| 1. | "Body Moves" | Rare Essence | 5:09 |
| 2. | "Back Up Against the Wall" | Rare Essence | 6:20 |
| 3. | "Shoo-Be-Do-Wop" | Rare Essence | 4:05 |
| 4. | "Umm Umm Good" (featuring Chuck Brown) | Rare Essence | 5:36 |
| 5. | "Do You Know What Time It Is?" | Moe Dewese | 4:58 |
| 6. | "Work the Walls" | Derek Floyd | 4:29 |
| 7. | "Lock It" | Micheal Neal; J. Karen Thomas | 5:52 |
| 8. | "Do the Mickey" | Rare Essence | 5:58 |
| 9. | "One on One" | Rare Essence | 7:35 |
| 10. | "Holy Ghost" | James Banks; Eddie Marion; Henderson Thigpen | 4:23 |
| Total length: | | | 54:25 |

== Personnel ==
- Charles "Shorty Corleone" Garris – vocals
- Andre "Whiteboy" Johnson – electric guitar, vocals
- Michael "Funky Ned" Neal – bass guitar
- Donnell Floyd – vocals, saxophone
- Kent Wood – keyboards
- Milton "Go-Go Mickey" Freeman – congas, percussion
- Derick Paige – trumpet, vocals
