= The Humdinger =

Studio album by Nappy Roots
- Released: August 5, 2008
- Recorded: 2005–2008
- Studios: Tree Sound Studios (Norcross, Georgia); The Kitchen Studios
- Genre: Hip hop
- Length: 1:01:26
- Label: Nappy Roots Entertainment Group
- Producers: Paul Diaz (exec.); Sol Messiah; James "Groove" Chambers; Big Al; Count Justice; Joe Hop; Kevin "Big Block" Freeman; N.A.; Vision; Willy Will; 3 Kingz

Nappy Roots chronology
Wooden Leather (2003)	The Humdinger (2008)	The Pursuit of Nappyness (2010)

Singles from The Humdinger
- 1. "Good Day" Released: Late 2007

The Humdinger is the third studio album by American hip hop quintet Nappy Roots from Kentucky. It was released on August 5, 2008 under Nappy Roots Entertainment Group record label's partnership with Fontana Distribution. Recording sessions took place at Tree Sound Studios in Atlanta and at the Kitchen Studios. Production was handled by Sol Messiah, James "Groove" Chambers, 3 Kingz, Big Al, Count Justice, Joe Hop, Kevin Freeman, N.A., Vision and Willy Will. The album features guest appearances from Slick & Rose, Anthony Hamilton, Greg Nice, James "Groove" Chambers and Tracy Hill.

The album peaked at number 73 on the Billboard 200 and at number 13 on the Top R&B/Hip-Hop Albums in the United States. Its lead single, "Good Day", made it to #54 on the Hot R&B/Hip-Hop Songs and the R&B/Hip-Hop Airplay, and was certified gold by the Recording Industry Association of America on September 21, 2018.

== Album information ==
Professional ratings
Review scores
Source	Rating
HipHopDX	4/5 stars
RapReviews	(8/10)
Spin	(5/10)

The Humdinger was set to be released in 2005, a follow-up to the group's 2003 album Wooden Leather, but was delayed several times. It is the group's first studio album not to feature R. Prophet, who left the group to pursue a solo career, and it is also their first studio album released via their own independent record label Nappy Roots Entertainment Group.

Several tracks of the album, including "Good Day", were previously featured on their 2007 mixtape Innerstate Music. The song "Tinted Up" was previously presented on their 2008 mixtape Cookout Muzik.

== Track listing ==
No.	Title	Writer(s)	Producer(s)	Length
1.	"Intro"			0:56
2.	"Beads & Braids"	William Hughes; Vito Tisdale; Brian Scott; Ernest Franklin	Sol Messiah	3:39
3.	"On My Way to GA"	Melvin Adams; Hughes; Scott; Franklin	Sol Messiah	4:40
4.	"Pole Position" (featuring Slick & Rose)	Adams; Hughes; Scott; Alverrick Powell	Vision	4:27
5.	"Flex"	Adams; Tisdale; Hughes; Ronald Wilson; Scott; William Hodge	Willy Will	3:49
6.	"Swerve and Lean"	Hughes; Franklin	Sol Messiah	4:12
7.	"Good Day"	Tisdale; Adams; Hughes	Big Al	4:21
8.	"Down 'N Out" (featuring Anthony Hamilton)	Hughes; Scott; Adams; Kevin Freeman	Kevin Freeman	4:28
9.	"Tinted Up" (featuring Groove Chambers)	Adams; Tisdale; Scott; Wilson; Hughes; James Chambers	James "Groove" Chambers	3:55
10.	"Fresh"	Tisdale; Hughes; Adams; Scott; Wilson; J. Watkins; C. Middleton; A. Jergin	3 Kingz	4:26
11.	"Kalifornia Dreamin'" (featuring Slick & Rose)	Adams; Hughes; Scott; Visdale; Franklin	Sol Messiah	3:51
12.	"Who Got It???"	Scott; Tisdale; Hughes; Wilson; Joe Hopper	Joe Hop	3:24
13.	"No Static" (featuring Greg Nice)	Adams; Hughes; Franklin	Sol Messiah	3:22
14.	"Don't Stop" (featuring Groove Chambers)	Scott; Adams; Tisdale; Hughes; Wilson; Chambers	James "Groove" Chambers	3:52
15.	"Panic Room"	Adams; Hughes; Tisdale; Tracy Hill	N.A.	3:07
16.	"Small Town"	Tisdale; Adams; Hughes; Justin Johnson	Count Justice	4:57
Total length:				1:01:26

== Personnel ==
Technical

- Slavic Livins– mixing
- Joel "HoP" Hopper-Engineer and Mix
