= R. Prophet =

American rapper

- Born: Kenneth Ryan Anthony; November 29, 1977 (age 48); Oakland, California, U.S.
- Genre: Hip hop
- Occupation: Rapper
- Instrument: Vocals
- Years active: 1997–present

Kenneth Ryan Anthony (born November 29, 1977) better known by his stage name R. Prophet, is an American rapper. He was formerly in the Kentucky-based sextet alternative southern rap group Nappy Roots. He attended Western Kentucky University with the present Nappy Roots members.

== Early career ==
R. Prophet was born Kenneth Ryan Anthony to Everett and Janice Anthony at Kaiser Hospital in Oakland, California. His older sibling died on November 15, 1972, of Sudden Infant Death Syndrome. He relocated to Louisville, Kentucky in 1985. Anthony later pursued acting and theatre by attending duPont Manual High School's Youth Performing Arts School, one of only two programs in Kentucky allowing high school students to major in performing arts. Anthony excelled quickly starring in several plays, commercials, and short films. After graduating from high school, Anthony went on to attend Western Kentucky University where he would later start his music career.

== Music career ==
=== 1997–99: Career beginnings ===
In 1997, while attending Western Kentucky University, R. Prophet joined Skinny DeVille, B. Stille, Ron Clutch, Big V and Fish Scales to complete Nappy Roots, an American alternative Southern rap group. Nappy Roots began recording at ET's Music, a record store/studio. They released a full-length debut titled "Country Fried Cess" in 1998. This independent effort caught the attention of several major labels, and the group later signed to Atlantic Records in 1999.

=== 2000–2004: Watermelon, Chicken & Gritz ===
The group's first album released on Atlantic was 2002's "Watermelon, Chicken & Gritz". The album includes the singles "Headz Up", "Awnaw" and Grammy nominated "Po' Folks" featuring Anthony Hamilton. The song's signature concept, verse, and chorus was written by R. Prophet. Discussing the meaning of "Po' Folks," R. Prophet told MTV.com that the lyrics did not only speak of being poor as an economic issue. "It's a state of mind. It's not so bad being poor when you've got your family and God in your life and you have different values that, when it comes down to it, matter. A lot of other things really don't matter when God is knocking at your door." Po' Folks later went on to be awarded a BMI publishing award in 2002.

In 2003, R. Prophet and the group garnered several award nominations, including American Music Award nominations for Favorite New Artist and Favorite Band, Duo or Group in the Hip-Hop/R&B category. Nappy Roots was also nominated for Grammy awards for Best Rap/Sung Collaboration for "Po' Folks" and Grammy Award for Best Long Form Music Video for their DVD "The World According to Nappy."

Also in 2003, R. Prophet was among a group of celebrities and professional athletes who participated in USO Project Salute 2003, a tour that made stops throughout the Persian Gulf including Iraq. "This was an experience of a lifetime, being in an actual war zone, it's something I will never forget", remembers R. Prophet, of the USO tour. Nappy Roots was among the top groups requested to be a part of USO tour. Soon after, their third album Wooden Leather followed in the latter part of 2003, which featured the hit song "Round the Globe" and featured production from Kanye West, David Banner, and Lil Jon. In 2004, R. Prophet worked with his group on the three songs for the soundtrack of the film The Ladykillers by Joel Coen and Ethan Coen.

=== 2005–present ===
In 2007, R. Prophet went on to pursue his solo career, traveling to Houston, Texas to record his first single, "Run Tell The DJ To Crank it" with former Cash Money producer Mannie Fresh. R. Prophet performed on-stage with the likes of Nelly, Ludacris, T.I., Young Buck, and Yung Joc. In 2008, R. Prophet was featured in Hilary Duff's single "Reach Out" from her album, "Best of Hilary Duff". However, he was not officially credited for this.

On April 20, 2013, Prophet was beaten, tased and arrested by Kentucky State Police, who told TMZ he was highly intoxicated, walked directly into traffic and was a danger to himself and others. He said it was "definitely racial profiling" while the police said he resisted arrest and kicked out the back window of a police car. In his 2020 autobiography, he writes that the grand jury found "no true bill," so the charges against him were dismissed.

On July 22, 2015, R. Prophet appeared as a potential "catfish" victim on Season 4, Episode 13, of MTV's Catfish. In 2020, he published his autobiography, Grams To Grammys: How Ryan Prophet went from Selling Grams to being Nominated for the Grammys.

== Awards and honors ==
R. Prophet was appointed to the former Advisory Council of the Muhammad Ali Center.

Due to the contributions made by R. Prophet and Nappy Roots in the state of Kentucky and abroad, Governor Paul E. Patton declared Sept. 16, 2002, as "Nappy Roots Day" and members of the group were inducted into the "Honorable Order of Kentucky Colonels," the highest civic honor bestowed by the Commonwealth of Kentucky.

== Discography ==
=== Major albums (with Nappy Roots) ===
Album information
Watermelon, Chicken & Gritz
- RIAA Certification: Platinum
- Released: February 26, 2002
- Billboard 200 chart position: #24
- R&B/Hip-Hop chart position: #3
- Singles: "Awnaw", "Po' Folks", "Headz Up"
Wooden Leather
- RIAA Certification: Gold
- Released: August 26, 2003
- Billboard 200 chart position: #12
- R&B/Hip-Hop chart position: #9
- Singles: "Roun' the Globe", "Sick and Tired"

=== Mixtapes (With Nappy Roots) ===
Album information
Country Fried Cess
- Release: 1998
No Comb No Brush No Fade No Perm
- Release: 2000
The Leak
- Release: 2005
Nappy Roots Music Presents - The Kentucky Kolonels Vol. 1
- Release: 2006
90 In The Slow Lane
- Released: 2006
Innerstate Music
- Released: 2007
Cookout Muzik
- Released: 2008
