= Doin' It Old School Style =

Live album by Rare Essence
- Released: May 8, 2001
- Recorded: September 9, 2000
- Venue: Club U, Washington, D.C.
- Genre: go-go; old-school hip hop
- Length: 2:01:13
- Label: Rare One; Liaison
- Producer: James Thomas (exec.); Andre Johnson

Rare Essence chronology
RE-2000 (1999)	Doin' It Old School Style (2001)	Live PA #6 (2002)

Doin' It Old School Style (also title as Doin' It Old School Style: Live at Club U) is a double-live album released on May 8, 2001, by the Washington, D.C.–based go-go band Rare Essence. The album was recorded live on September 9, 2000, at Club U, a music venue located on the historic U Street in Northwest, Washington, D.C., and includes the go-go rendition of Sade's song "No Ordinary Love".

The album's cover art is a throwback 80s-styled event poster which includes names of the former go-go clubs from around the Washington metropolitan area (such as Howard Theatre, Celebrity Hall (aka "The Black Hole") and the Coliseum).

== Track listing ==
Disc 1

1. "The 'In' Crowd" (written by Billy Page) – 9:28
2. "Hey Buddy Buddy" (written by Michael Neal, J. Karen Thomas) – 7:43
3. "Get on the Wagon" – 8:01
4. "Cherchez la R.E." (featuring Ms. Kim) – 7:45
5. "Take Me Out to the Go-Go" – 10:06
6. "One on One" – 7:20
7. "Mickey's Solo" – 3:58
8. "Lock It" (written by Michael Neal, J. Karen Thomas) – 15:11
9. "No Ordinary Love" (written by Sade Adu, Stuart Matthewman) – 4:22

Disc 2

1. "Live concert video" – 47:17

== Personnel ==
- James "Jas Funk" Thomas – lead vocals
- Andre "Whiteboy" Johnson – electric guitar, vocals
- Milton "Go-Go Mickey" Freeman – congas, timbales, percussions
- Mike Baker – bass guitar
- Donnell Floyd – tenor saxophone, vocals
- Byron "BJ" Jackson – keyboards, vocals
- Kent Wood – keyboards
- Michael Smith – drums
- Ms. Kim – vocals
