= Mixtape, Vol. 1 =

Mixtape, Vol. 1 may refer to:

- Mixtape, Vol. 1 (Rare Essence album), a Rare Essence remix album hosted by DJ Dirty Rico (2012)
- Mixtape, Vol. 1 (EP), an EP by Kane Brown (2020)
- Mixtape Vol. 1, mixtape by Rock Mafia (2012)

== See also ==
- Kwesachu Mixtape Vol.1, by Kwes. & Micachu (2009)
- T-Pain Presents: Nappy Boy Mixtape Vol. 1, mixtape by T-Pain (2014)
- Turn Off the Radio: The Mixtape Vol. 1 by duo Dead Prez (2002)
