= Count Justice =

American musician

- Birth name: Justin Booth Johnson
- Origin: Los Angeles, California
- Genres: Hip Hop; R&B; Pop
- Occupations: Songwriter; Producer; Engineer

Justin Booth "Count Justice" Johnson is from Los Angeles, California. He is a songwriter, producer and engineer who has most notably produced songs for Chris Brown ("New Flame"), Alesha Dixon ("Top Of The World"), Sevyn Streeter ("Shoulda Been There"), Nappy Roots ("Small Town") and Lil Mama ("Stand Up").

== Selected discography ==
Partial list of writer & producer credits
Year	Title	Album	Artist(s)
2016	"All You Gotta Do"	Tini	Martina Stoessel
2016	"Take Time"	Transitions	Marley Waters featuring Kranium
2016	"The Meaning"	1st Time for Everything EP	FKi 1st featuring Post Malone
2016	"Gazi"	Promo Single	A. Chal
2016	"Pour Up"	130 mood: TRBL	Dean featuring ZICO
2015	"Top Of The World"	Do It For Love	Alesha Dixon
2015	"Shoulda Been There"	Shoulda Been There, Pt 1	Sevyn Streeter
2014	"New Flame"	X	Chris Brown
2008	"Stand Up"	VYP (Voice of the Young People)	Lil Mama
2008	"Small Town"	The Humdinger	Nappy Roots
2006	"Hard headed"	ATL - Music from the Motion Picture	Bobby Creekwater
