= The Reunion (Rare Essence album) =

Live album by Rare Essence
- Released: January 11, 2015
- Recorded: September 11, 2010
- Venue: Hyatt Regency, Crystal City, Virginia
- Genre: Go-go; hip-hop
- Length: 63:18
- Label: Rare One; Liaison
- Producer: Andre Johnson

Rare Essence chronology
Live PA #16 (2013)	The Reunion (2015)	Turn it Up (2016)

The Reunion (also titled as The Reunion: Live At The Hyatt Regency 9.11.2010) is a live album released on January 11, 2015 by the Washington, D.C.-based go-go band Rare Essence. The album was recorded live at the Hyatt Regency in Crystal City, Virginia on September 11, 2010.

== Track listing ==
1. "Intro" – 2:31
2. "I Got That Feelin'/Roll Call" – 5:42
3. "R.E. Herman" – 5:03
4. "Do You Know What Time it Is?" – 4:42
5. "Hey Buddy, Buddy" – 3:56
6. "GoGo Mickey" – 7:16
7. "Cherchez La R.E." – 6:21
8. "20 Minute Workout" – 2:27
9. "Uh Oh/Where My Troopers At?" – 3:26
10. "Where They At?" – 3:10
11. "Geraldine" – 3:54
12. "Party Lights" – 2:01
13. "Lock It" – 3:56
14. "King of the GoGo Beat" – 3:27
15. "Work the Walls" – 2:13
16. "All Da Time" – 3:24

== Personnel ==
- Andre "Whiteboy" Johnson – electric guitar, vocals
- James "Jas Funk" Thomas – vocals
- Darrell "Blue-Eye" Arrington – drums
- Michael "Lil Mike" Smith – drums
- Milton "Go-Go Mickey" Freeman – congas, percussions
- Tyron "Jungle Boogie" Williams – congas, percussions
- John "JB" Buchanan – flugelhorn, keyboards
- Michael "Funky Ned" Neal – bass guitar
- Michael Baker – bass guitar
- Byron "BJ" Jackson – keyboards
- Benjamin "Scotty" Haskel – keyboards
- Mark "Godfather" Lawson – keyboards
- Norris "Marky" Qwens – keyboards
- Eric "Bojack" Butcher – percussions
- Quentin "Shorty Dud" Ivey – percussions
- Donnell Floyd – saxophone, vocals
- Rory "DC" Felton – saxophone, trombone
- Derek "DP" Paige – trumpet
- Charles "Shorty Corleone" Garris – vocals
- Kimberly "Ms. Kim" Graham – vocals
- Kenecia "KeKe" Taylor – vocals
- Bonita Glenn – vocals
- Lawrence "Maniac" West – vocals
- Michael Muse – vocals
