= Mixtape, Vol. 2 =

Mixtape, Vol. 2: Hosted by DJ Dirty Rico

Remix album by Rare Essence
- Released: July 2, 2013
- Genre: Go-go; hip-hop
- Length: 65:50
- Label: Rare One; Liaison

Rare Essence chronology
Mixtape, Vol. 1 (2012)	Mixtape, Vol. 2: Hosted by DJ Dirty Rico (2013)

Mixtape, Vol. 2 (also titled as Mixtape, Vol. 2: Hosted by DJ Dirty Rico) is a remix album released on July 2, 2013, by the Washington, D.C.–based go-go band Rare Essence. The album was compiled and remixed by DJ Dirty Rico. The album follows-up with the 2012 album Mixtape, Vol. 1.

== Track listing ==
No.	Title	Length
1.	"Lock It"	4:59
2.	"What It Do"	3:18
3.	"Work That Thang"	4:24
4.	"Pieces of Me"	2:10
5.	"Guy Sample Joint"	1:32
6.	"Overnight Scenario"	2:18
7.	"Work the Walls"	0:41
8.	"Work the Walls [Live]"	3:13
9.	"Stevie Wonder Intro"	0:15
10.	"Yes, Come On"	2:26
11.	"Loveable"	2:00
12.	"Rock This Party [Rub Mix]"	1:50
13.	"Rock This Party"	3:08
14.	"Body Snatchers"	3:03
15.	"Go Down Baby"	2:47
16.	"Wickedest Band Alive"	0:47
17.	"Camay All Over"	0:42
18.	"I'm Straight"	0:37
19.	"Must Be Like That"	1:12
20.	"Wickedest Band Alive revisited"	0:21
21.	"King of the Go-Go Beat"	2:52
22.	"The Hop"	1:04
23.	"The Hop [Live]"	2:24
24.	"Dirty Rico Interlude"	1:04
25.	"Guess Who's Back"	3:03
26.	"Rico Introduces Killa Cal"	0:07
27.	"My Car"	2:48
28.	"Where They At?"	2:15
29.	"Get Your Freak On"	1:24
30.	"Take Me Out to the Go-Go"	1:21
31.	"Freaky Deak"	0:47
32.	"Party With Me"	1:47
33.	"What Nigga What"	2:31
34.	"Rico's Exit"	0:23
35.	"NoiseMaker Nation"	0:17
Total length:		65:50
