= No Ordinary Love =

1992 single by Sade

Single by Sade

from the album Love Deluxe
- B-side: "Paradise" (remix)
- Released: 28 September 1992
- Studio: The Hit Factory (New York City)
- Genre: Quiet storm; pop; R&B
- Length: 7:20 (album version); 5:22 (single version)
- Label: Epic
- Songwriters: Sade Adu; Stuart Matthewman
- Producer: Sade

Sade singles chronology
"Haunt Me" (1989)	"No Ordinary Love" (1992)	"Feel No Pain" (1992)

Music video
- "No Ordinary Love" on YouTube

"No Ordinary Love" is a song by English band Sade, released in September 1992 by Epic Records as the lead single from their fourth studio album, Love Deluxe (1992), on which the song appears as the opening track. It was written by lead singer Sade Adu and Stuart Matthewman. In the United Kingdom, the single was originally issued in September 1992, then was re-issued in mid-1993 following its appearance in the erotic drama film Indecent Proposal.

The song was commercially successful, reaching the top 10 in Greece and Italy and entering the top 40 in seven other countries. In the accompanying music video, directed by Sophie Muller, Adu plays a mermaid who wants to be a bride. American magazine Rolling Stone included "No Ordinary Love" on their list of the "500 Best Songs of All Time" in 2024.

== Critical reception ==
The song received positive reviews from music critics. Sade won a Grammy Award for Best R&B Performance by a Duo or Group with Vocals in 1994. That same yame year, "No Ordinary Love" was also awarded one of ASCAP's R&B Music Awards, as well as one of BMI's Pop Songs Awards, honoring the songwriters, composers, and music publishers of the song.

Larry Flick from Billboard magazine stated that it shows Sade and band "in fine form, sounding, as always, cool and sexy." He also said that her "famously smoky voice is the highlight of a spare arrangement, supported by percussive guitar and even a ghostly metal solo." Amy Linden from Entertainment Weekly found that Sade, "the high priestess of understated cool, heats up on the fabulous "No Ordinary Love", which surges with emotion." Dave Sholin of the Gavin Report felt that "her extraordinary songstyling is hotter than ever." Another Gavin Report editor, John Martinucci, said, "At last, the sensual vocals of Sade return with a hypnotic beat underlined by an occasional, crunching guitar."

Caroline Sullivan from The Guardian felt the singer's "sleepy croon doesn't waver" as she's "purring a breathless poem" about her mister. David Stubbs from Melody Maker viewed it as "another syrupy ladling". Pan-European magazine Music & Media remarked that "the grande dame of sophisticated soul has updated her beats a little bit and added a more wiggly guitar sound." A reviewer from Music Week named it "a stylish, sophisticated, subdued and superior song", adding, "It's also extremely subtle". Jeff Silberman from The Network Forty complimented its "languid beat and the cool, cool melody" A writer for People Magazine viewed the song as "a baby-making slow jam that comes on like musical Viagra."

In a 2017 retrospective review, Justin Chadwick from Albumism described the song as "insistent and intimate", adding that it's "evoking the desperation of trying to secure an elusive love". He also noted that the song begins with "one of the most devastating intros ever". In 2012, Sophie Heawood of The Guardian commented, "The band reached their peak of opulent sound design on the aptly titled album Love Deluxe; its seven-minute epic of a lead single is as bleak as it is sensual, casting heartbreak as the greatest luxury of all." In 2010, the Daily Vault's Mark Millan declared it as "intoxicating". He added that it "is Adu's lament of a one-sided love affair", noting that it "harbors a serious groove, but the underlying anger of love gone bad is represented with a subtle but powerful guitar riff that helps get the job done."

== Commercial performance ==
"No Ordinary Love" entered the top 10 in Greece and Italy, as well as on the European Dance Radio Chart, where it peaked at number nine in November 1992. Additionally, the song entered the top 20 in Finland, France, the Netherlands, and the United Kingdom, where it reached number 14 during its second run on the UK Singles Chart on 5 June 1993, making it Sade's second-most successful single in the UK, after "Your Love Is King" in 1984. The single received a silver record in the UK, after 200 000 units were sold. "No Ordinary Love" was also a top-30 hit in Switzerland and on the Eurochart Hot 100, a top-40 hit in Belgium and Sweden, and a top-50 hit in Germany. Outside Europe, it peaked at numbers 21 and 17 in Australia and New Zealand, respectively.

In the United States, the single charted on four different Billboard charts: number 28 on the Hot 100, number 14 on the Adult Contemporary chart, number 29 on the Top 40/Rhythm-Crossover chart and number nine on the Hot R&B Singles chart. "No Ordinary Love" also climbed to number 21 on the US Cash Box Top 100 and number 11 on the Cash Box Top R&B Singles chart.

== Music video ==
A music video produced to promote the single, directed by English music video director Sophie Muller, features Sade as a mermaid and a bride. At the beginning, Sade sits on the bottom of the ocean as a mermaid. Flashbacks reveal a young sailor, who has fallen into the water, meeting the mermaid in a kiss and embrace. Back in the present, the mermaid browses in an old weekly magazine and sews a white wedding dress. She swims up to shore in the finished dress with human legs, reaching land and throwing rice on herself like a newlywed bride. Obviously looking for the young man, she walks into a bar and drinks water with salt for survival. Devastated at not finding the sailor, she runs through the busy city streets, with a bottle of water, down to the quay. Again there are flashbacks of the mermaid with her sailor on the sea floor. As the video ends, she sits alone on the dock in her wedding dress looking down and waiting for her tail to reappear.

== Legacy ==
Frank Guan of Vulture ranked "No Ordinary Love" number two in a ranking of all of Sade's songs, writing, "'There's nothing like you and I,' she sings; the emphasis falls on 'nothing' no less than on 'you' or 'I.' Sade songs, at their very best, ignore the distinction between songs about flawless love and love betrayed; the promise of the first and the inevitability of the other are contained in one another. The softly puncturing bass, the deep-sea synths, the chugging, almost accusatory guitar that kicks in during the pre-chorus – even among other perfect songs, this one stands out. It's the longest song on any of her albums; it's also one you wish would last forever, but can't, just like the love in the title."

In 2012, Complex placed "No Ordinary Love" at number 43 in their ranking of "The Best 90s R&B Songs". In 2017, Spin ranked the song at number 15 on their list of "The 30 Best '90s R&B Songs". In 2024, Rolling Stone included "No Ordinary Love" in their list of the "500 Best Songs of All Time" at No. 459. In 2022, Pitchfork ranked it at number 42 in their list of "The 250 Best Songs of the 1990s".

"No Ordinary Love" was featured prominently in Indecent Proposal, though it was not included on the film's soundtrack album. The song was also featured in an early 1993 episode of the daytime soap opera Days of Our Lives. It appeared in the second-season episode of NBC's 30 Rock, "Jack Gets in the Game", when Kenneth Parcell tried to seduce Tracy Jordan's wife, Angie Jordan. The song was featured in the American Dad episode "Stan Goes on the Pill" when Stan Smith turns into a woman after taking a pill and his boss Bullock tries to seduce him. This song was featured in the trailer of Good Boys. In 2026, it received renewed cultural interest after featuring in the FX biographical series Love Story about JFK Jr. and Carolyn Bessette.

== Cover versions ==
- Serbian rock band Night Shift covered the song on their Undercovers album in 2002.
- Belgian house band Sweet Coffee covered the song on their 2004 album, Memory Lane.
- American rock band Deftones covered the song, with backing vocals from guest Jonah Matranga. The cover was initially featured as a track on the 2000 release of the single "Change (In the House of Flies)". It was later included on Deftones' 2005 B-side collection B-Sides & Rarities and their 2011 cover compilation, Covers. Vocalist Chino Moreno often cites Sade as one of his favourite artists.
- Pinoy rock band Urbandub also did a cover of the song, which was included on the EMI Music Philippines 2005 compilation Full Volume: The Best of Pinoy Alternative.
- The song was also covered instrumentally by trumpeter Chris Botti on his album When I Fall in Love in 2004.
- Marcia Hines covered the song on her album "Life" in 2007.
- Vesta Williams covered the song on her album "Distant Lover" in 2007.
- The Civil Wars covered it live in their album Live at Eddie's Attic, available on their website as a free Internet download.
- Richard Marx covered the song as "Ordinary Love" on his 2008 album titled Sundown.
- A cover of "No Ordinary Love" is featured as the tenth and final track of Dallas Green's and Alecia Moore's You+Me debut album Rose Ave. in 2014.
- Joanna Marie covered the song in English and Spanish as "Ordinary Love" and "Amor Ordinario" on her 1999 album "Simply Irresistible", released by Kariang Music.
- Liam Frost released a solo cover on his EP The Wild Places in 2014.
- Walden and Havana Brown released a dance version as a single in 2015.
- Lovi Poe is the second Filipino music artist to revive this song after Urdandub, her own rendition was used as soundtrack of her film The Escort.
- Rare Essence covered the song for their 2001 live album Doin' It Old School Style.
- Jazz musician and sax player George Howard also covered the song for his 1994 album A Home Far Away.

== Track listings ==
- UK, European and Australian CD single
1. "No Ordinary Love" – 5:22
2. "Paradise" (remix) – 5:40
3. "No Ordinary Love" (album version) – 7:20
- US CD single and Japanese mini CD single
1. "No Ordinary Love" – 5:21
2. "Paradise" (remix) – 5:40
- 7-inch single

A. "No Ordinary Love" – 5:22
B. "Paradise" (remix) – 5:40

- 12-inch maxi single

A. "No Ordinary Love" (album version) – 7:20
B1. "Paradise" (remix) – 5:40
B2. "Paradise" (drums and Sade) – 5:40

- Cassette single
1. "No Ordinary Love" – 5:22
2. "Paradise" (remix) – 5:40

== Charts ==
=== Weekly charts ===
Weekly chart performance for "No Ordinary Love"
Chart (1992–1993)	Peak position
Australia (ARIA)	21
Belgium (Ultratop 50 Flanders)	37
Canada Top Singles (RPM)	15
Canada Adult Contemporary (RPM)	15
Europe (Eurochart Hot 100 Singles)	26
Europe (European AC Radio)	1
Europe (European Dance Radio)	9
Europe (European Hit Radio)	4
Finland (Suomen virallinen lista)	19
France (SNEP)	20
Germany (GfK)	43
Greece (Pop + Rock)	5
Israel (Israeli Singles Chart)	24
Italy (Musica e dischi)	4
Netherlands (Dutch Top 40)	19
Netherlands (Single Top 100)	26
New Zealand (Recorded Music NZ)	17
Sweden (Sverigetopplistan)	33
Switzerland (Schweizer Hitparade)	23
UK Singles (Official Charts)	14
UK Airplay (Music Week)	31
UK Dance (Music Week)	16
US Billboard Hot 100	28
US Adult Contemporary (Billboard)	14
US Hot R&B/Hip-Hop Songs (Billboard)	9
US Rhythmic Airplay (Billboard)	29
US Cash Box Top 100	21
US Top 100 R&B Singles (Cash Box)	11

=== Year-end charts ===
Year-end chart performance for "No Ordinary Love"
Chart (1993)	Position
US Hot R&B Singles (Billboard)	71

== Certifications ==
Certifications and sales for "No Ordinary Love"
Region	Certification	Certified units/sales
United Kingdom (BPI)	Silver	200,000^{‡}
^{‡} Sales+streaming figures based on certification alone.

== Release history ==
Release dates and formats for "No Ordinary Love"
Region	Date	Format(s)	Label(s)	Ref.
United Kingdom	28 September 1992	7-inch vinyl; 12-inch vinyl; CD; cassette	Epic	
Australia	5 October 1992	CD; cassette	Epic	
Japan	21 October 1992	Mini-CD	Epic	
United Kingdom (re-release)	24 May 1993	7-inch vinyl; CD; cassette	Epic	
