= Live @ Club U, Volume II =

Live album by Rare Essence
- Released: July 29, 2003
- Venue: Club U Washington, D.C.
- Genre: Go-go; old-school hip hop
- Length: 73:49
- Label: Rare One; Liaison
- Producer: Andre Johnson; Doug E. Fresh; James Thomas (assoc.)

Rare Essence chronology
Live PA #4 (2002)	Live @ Club U, Volume II (2003)	Live in 2004 (2004)

Live @ Club U, Volume II (also referred to as Old School Go-Go Meets Old School Hip-Hop) is a live album released on July 29, 2003, by the Washington, D.C.–based go-go band Rare Essence. The album is follow-up to the 2001 album Doin' It Old School Style (also recorded live at Club U) and features guest appearances by Doug E. Fresh & the Get Fresh Crew and Anthony "Lil' Benny" Harley.

== Track listing ==
1. "Camay All Over" – 5:47
2. "Display" – 7:26
3. "Do You Wanna Have Some Fun?" – 5:59
4. "Mickey's Solo" – 4:36
5. "Heap Big Fun" – 8:19
6. "Glass House" – 7:49
7. "Back Up Against the Wall" – 7:04
8. "Play This Only at Night" (featuring Doug E. Fresh) – 5:50
9. "D.E.F." (featuring Doug E. Fresh) – 5:41
10. "La Di da Di (2003)" (featuring Doug E. Fresh) – 6:48
11. "I'm Gettin' Ready" (featuring Doug E. Fresh) – 8:30

== Personnel ==
- Andre "White Boy" Johnson – electric guitar, vocals
- James "Jas Funk" Thomas – guest vocals
- Anthony "Lil' Benny" Harley – trumpet, guest vocals
- Doug E. Fresh – guest vocals
- Milton "Go-Go Mickey" Freeman – percussion, congas
- Kent Wood – electronic keyboards
- Roy Battle – trombone, keyboards
- Mike Baker – bass guitar
- Kimberly "Ms. Kim" Graham – vocals
- Charles "Shorty Corleone" Garris – vocals
- Michael "Lil' Mike" – drums
- Quentin "Lil' Dud" Ivey – timbales, cowbell, rototoms
- Michael Muse – vocals
