= The Sound Explosion =

Greek garage rock revival band

The Sound Explosion is a Greek garage rock revival band formed in 1991 in Athens, Greece. Its line up is John Alexopoulos (vocals, 6 and 12 string Vox guitar, harmonica), Dimitrios Dimopoulos (Bass guitar, backing vocals), Stelios Askoxylakis (Farfisa organ, backing vocals) and Stavros Daktylas (drums, tambourine). The group has played several concerts in Greece alongside other bands such as The Fuzztones, Dead Moon, Sick Rose, Cynics, the Others, the Marshmallow Overcoat, and more. The band went on a hiatus in 1997, during which time the members played separately in different acts, before reuniting in the early 2000s to perform live once again. In early 2018 the group partnered with Lost in Tyme Records to release their sophomore album, The explosive Sounds of... The Sound Explosion, marking their first new material in nearly 24 years.

== Discography ==
=== Albums ===
- Teen Trash Volume 14: From Athens, Greece (LP/CD) (Music Maniac Records) (1994)
- The Explosive Sounds Of the Sound Explosion (LP/CD) (Lost In Tyme) (2018)

=== Singles and EPs ===
- Hangover Baby / Some Other Guy (Pegasus Records) (1993)
- I'll Shake The Universe / Why Can't You See (Dionysus Records) (1994)
- Another Lie / Misirlou The Greek (Studio II) (1995)
- The Last Recordings EP (Το Δισκάδικο) (2000)
- The Sound Explosion / The Basements - Split (Lost In Tyme) 2013
