= Old to the New =

1994 single by Nice & Smooth

Single by Nice & Smooth

from the album Jewel of the Nile
- B-side: "Blunts"
- Released: 1994
- Genre: Hip hop
- Length: 4:13
- Label: Rush Associated Labels
- Songwriter(s): Gregory Mays; Darryl Barnes; Luis Vega Jr.
- Producer(s): Luis "Phat Kat" Vega

Nice & Smooth singles chronology
"Dwyck" (1992)	"Old to the New" (1994)	"Return of the Hip Hop Freaks" (1994)

Music video
- "Old to the New" on YouTube

"Old to the New" is a song by American hip hop duo Nice & Smooth and the lead single from their third studio album Jewel of the Nile (1994). Produced by Luis "Phat Kat" Vega, it samples Three Dog Night's cover of "Easy to Be Hard" from the rock musical Hair and Lou Donaldson's cover of "Ode To Billie Joe" by Bobbie Gentry.

== Background ==
After the success of their song "Sometimes I Rhyme Slow", Nice & Smooth were looking to make another hit song, which would eventually become "Old to the New". They used a sample flip for that purpose.

== Charts ==
Chart (1994)	Peak position
US Billboard Hot 100	59
US Hot R&B/Hip-Hop Songs (Billboard)	43
US Hot Rap Songs (Billboard)	6
