= Watermelon, Chicken & Gritz =

Studio album by Nappy Roots
- Released: February 26, 2002
- Recorded: 2001
- Studios: Tree Sound Studios (Norcross, Georgia); Sound Stage Studios (Nashville, Tennessee); Patchwerks (Atlanta, Georgia); Rusk Sound Studios (Hollywood, California); Larrabee West (West Hollywood, California); Larrabee North (Universal City, California); Image Recording Studios (Los Angeles, California); Signature Sound (San Diego, California)
- Genre: Hip hop
- Length: 1:14:50
- Label: Atlantic
- Producers: Terrance Camp; Mike Caren; James "Groove" Chambers; Trackboyz; Troy Johnson; Brian Kidd; Carlos "Six July" Broady; Mike City

Nappy Roots chronology
No Comb, No Brush, No Fade, No Perm... (1999)	Watermelon, Chicken & Gritz (2002)	Wooden Leather (2003)

Singles from Watermelon, Chicken & Gritz
- 1. "Awnaw" Released: December 4, 2001; 2. "Po' Folks" Released: July 10, 2002; 3. "Headz Up" Released: November 26, 2002

Professional ratings
Review scores
Source	Rating
AllMusic	4/5 stars
Entertainment Weekly	B
HipHopDX	3/5 stars
NME	(6/10)
Q	4/5 stars
RapReviews	(7.5/10)
Robert Christgau	(1-star Honorable Mention)
Rolling Stone	3.5/5 stars
Spin	(8/10)
Stylus Magazine	B+

Watermelon, Chicken & Gritz is the debut album by the American hip-hop sextet Nappy Roots from Kentucky. It was released on February 26, 2002, via Atlantic Records.

== Background ==
Recording sessions took place at Tree Sound and PatchWerk Recording Studios in Atlanta, at Soundstage Studios in Nashville, at Rusk, Larrabee West & North and Image Recording Studios in Los Angeles, and at Signature Sound in San Diego. Production was handled mostly by James "Groove" Chambers, along with the Trackboyz, Mike Caren, Mike City, Brian Kidd, Carlos Broady and Troy Johnson. It features guest appearances from Anthony Hamilton, the Bar-Kays, Jazze Pha, Ayesha Kirk, CJ "Voodou" Henry and Tiffany Villarreal.

== Reception ==
The album peaked at number 24 on the Billboard 200 and at number 3 on the Top R&B/Hip-Hop Albums chart in the United States. It was certified Gold by the Recording Industry Association of America on April 16, 2002, and reached Platinum on October 10, 2002.

The album was preceded by a promotional single "Set It Out"/"Hustla" and its lead single "Awnaw", both released in 2001. "Awnaw", featuring vocals from Jazze Pha, made it to #51 on the Billboard Hot 100 singles chart. The second single from the album was "Po' Folks" featuring Anthony Hamilton, which also reached Billboard Hot 100 at peak position number 21. The albums' third single, "Headz Up", charted at number 88 on the Hot R&B/Hip-Hop Songs and at number 39 on the Rhythmic Songs.

== Track listing ==
Credits adapted from the album's liner notes.

No.	Title	Writer(s)	Producer(s)	Length
1.	"Intro"		James "Groove" Chambers	0:26
2.	"Hustla"	James Chambers; William Hughes; Vito Tisdale; Melvin Adams; Brian Scott; Ryan Anthony	James "Groove" Chambers	3:45
3.	"Set It Out"	Chambers; Hughes; Anthony; Adams; Scott	James "Groove" Chambers	3:52
4.	"Country Boyz"	Brian Kidd; Hughes; Anthony; Adams; Scott	Brian Kidd	4:30
5.	"Ballin' on a Budget"	Chambers; Hughes; Tisdale; Adams; Scott	James "Groove" Chambers	3:42
6.	"Awnaw" (featuring Jazze Pha)	Chambers; Hughes; Tisdale; Adams; Anthony	James "Groove" Chambers	3:59
7.	"Headz Up"	Chambers; Mike Caren; Hughes; Scott; Ronald Wilson; Adams; Tisdale; Anthony	James "Groove" Chambers	4:07
8.	"Slums" (featuring CJ "Voodou" Henry)	Chambers; Tisdale; Adams; Anthony	James "Groove" Chambers	3:22
9.	"Po' Folks" (featuring Anthony Hamilton)	Mark Williams; Joe Kent; Hughes; Tisdale; Anthony	The Trackboyz; Mike Caren (add.)	4:08
10.	"Start It Over"	Williams; Kent; Hughes; Tisdale; Anthony	The Trackboyz	4:05
11.	"Blowin' Trees"	Chambers; Hughes; Tisdale; Adams; Scott; Anthony; Wilson	James "Groove" Chambers	4:17
12.	"Sholiz"	Mike Dann; Hughes; Adams; Scott	Mike City	4:08
13.	"Life's a Bitch"	Carlos Broady; Hughes; Tisdale; Adams	Carlos "6 July" Broady	4:39
14.	"My Ride" (featuring Ayesha Kirk)	Chambers; Hughes; Adams; Scott; Chris Henry	James "Groove" Chambers	3:26
15.	"One Forty"	Chambers; Wilson; Hughes; Scott	James "Groove" Chambers	4:25
16.	"Dime, Quarter, Nickel, Penny"	Troy Johnson; Hughes; Scott; Adams; Anthony	Troy Johnson	3:48
17.	"Kentucky Mud"	Chambers; Hughes; Tisdale; Scott	James "Groove" Chambers	4:45
18.	"The Lounge"		James "Groove" Chambers	0:39
19.	"Ho Down" (featuring The Bar-Kays)	Edward Harris; Caren; Hughes; Adams; Scott; Cortez Murray	Mike Caren	4:45
20.	"Headz Up (Refried)" (featuring Tiffany Villarreal)	Johnson; Chambers; Caren; Hughes; Scott; Wilson; Adams; Tisdale; Anthony	Troy Johnson	4:02
Total length:				1:14:50

Sample Credits

- "Ho Down" contains an interpolation of "Delgado", written by Edward Harris.

== Charts ==
=== Weekly charts ===
Chart (2002)	Peak position
US Billboard 200	24
US Top R&B/Hip-Hop Albums (Billboard)	3

=== Year-end charts ===
Chart (2002)	Position
US Billboard 200	62
US Top R&B/Hip-Hop Albums (Billboard)	21

== Certifications ==
Region	Certification	Certified units/sales
United States (RIAA)	Platinum	1,000,000^{^}
^{^} Shipments figures based on certification alone.
