= Jewel of the Nile =

Studio album by Nice & Smooth
- Released: June 28, 1994
- Recorded: 1993–94
- Studio: Cherokee; Larrabbee; Hit Factory; Axis; Quad; D&D Recording; Soundtracks Battery Studios; Soul Convention
- Genre: Hip hop
- Length: 39:14
- Label: Rush Associated Labels
- Producer: Greg Nice; Showbiz; Little Louie Vega; Mark Morales; Mark Spark; Mark C. Rooney

Nice & Smooth chronology
Ain't a Damn Thing Changed (1991)	Jewel of the Nile (1994)	IV: Blazing Hot (1997)

Singles from Jewel of the Nile
- 1. "Old to the New" Released: 1994; 2. "Return of the Hip Hop Freaks" Released: 1994

Professional ratings
Review scores
Source	Rating
AllMusic	3/5 stars

Jewel of the Nile is the third studio album by American hip-hop duo Nice & Smooth. It was released on June 28, 1994, via Rush Associated Labels with distribution by PolyGram Group Distribution, Inc. The album was produced by Greg Nice, Showbiz, Luis "Phat Kat" Vega, Mark Morales, Mark Spark, and Mark C. Rooney. It peaked at number 66 on the Billboard 200 and at number 13 on the Top R&B/Hip-Hop Albums chart in the United States. Jewel of the Nile spawned two singles: "Old to the New" and "Return of the Hip Hop Freaks".

== Track listing ==
No.	Title	Producer(s)	Length
1.	"Return of the Hip Hop Freaks"	Greg Nice	3:16
2.	"The Sky's the Limit"	Greg Nice	3:32
3.	"Let's All Get Down" (featuring Slick Rick)	Greg Nice	3:41
4.	"Doin' Our Own Thang"	Mark Spark	4:28
5.	"Do Whatcha Gotta"	Showbiz; Greg Nice	3:08
6.	"Old to the New"	Luis "Phat Kat" Vega	4:13
7.	"Blunts"	Showbiz; Greg Nice	2:28
8.	"Get Fucked Up"	Greg Nice; Luis "Phat Kat" Vega (co.)	2:31
9.	"Save the Children" (featuring Everlast)	Greg Nice	3:01
10.	"Cheri" (featuring Jo-Jo Hailey & Mark C. Rooney)	Prince Markie Dee; Cory Rooney	5:58
11.	"No Bones (Remix)" (Bonus Track)	Greg Nice	2:58
Total length:			39:14

== Chart history ==
Chart (1994)	Peak position
US Billboard 200	66
US Top R&B/Hip-Hop Albums (Billboard)	13
