= Hip Hop Junkies =

1991 single by Nice & Smooth

Single by Nice & Smooth

from the album Ain't a Damn Thing Changed
- Released: 1991
- Genre: Hip hop
- Length: 3:29
- Label: Rush Associated Labels; Columbia
- Songwriter(s): Gregory Mays; Darryl Barnes
- Producer(s): Nice & Smooth

Nice & Smooth singles chronology
"Sometimes I Rhyme Slow" (1991)	"Hip Hop Junkies" (1991)	"How to Flow" (1991)

Music video
- "Hip Hop Junkies" on YouTube

"Hip Hop Junkies" is a song by American hip hop duo Nice & Smooth and the second single from their second studio album Ain't a Damn Thing Changed (1991). It contains samples of "I Think I Love You" by The Partridge Family and "My Prerogative" by Bobby Brown.

== Composition ==
The production consists of a synth bass line, programmed finger clicks, and a snapping drum loop.

== Critical reception ==
Reviewing Ain't a Damn Thing Changed for The Quietus, Angus Batey wrote that "Hip Hop Junkies" "is the one that proves above all others that this album should have been a ginormous global smash", praising the song for simplicity, the "irresistibly silly pop sample" of "I Think I Love You", and "some inspired stream-of-consciousness gibberish" from Greg Nice and Smooth B.

== Charts ==
Chart (1991)	Peak position
US Hot R&B/Hip-Hop Songs (Billboard)	38
US Hot Rap Songs (Billboard)	5
