= Dexter's Laboratory: The Hip-Hop Experiment =

2002 compilation album by various hip hop artists

Compilation album by various artists
- Released: August 20, 2002
- Genre: Hip-hop
- Length: 21:12
- Label: Kid Rhino/Atlantic Records
- Producers: Karen Ahmed, Mike Engstrom, Craig Kallman

Dexter's Laboratory: The Hip-Hop Experiment is a compilation album that features songs by various hip-hop artists inspired by the Cartoon Network animated television series Dexter's Laboratory. It was released on August 20, 2002, on CD through Kid Rhino and Atlantic Records and as a limited collector's edition green vinyl. Its release was accompanied by three music videos for the tracks "Back to the Lab" by Prince Paul, "Dexter (What's His Name?)" by Coolio, and "Secrets" by will.i.am.

== Background ==
Coolio, a fan of Dexter's Laboratory, was more than happy to make a song for the soundtrack, stating, "They called me to do a song for Dexter's Laboratory and I didn't really know what I wanted to do at first, but I knew I wanted it to be positive and lively." He then said when it came time for recording he thought it was important to consult the opinions of certain people first: "I had my children in the studio with me. They watch Dexter's Laboratory and they represent the audience for the show, so it made sense to ask them for their opinions. I played them a demo of the songs and they told me what they thought."

=== Promotion ===
In August 2002, Cartoon Network promoted the soundtrack by releasing three music videos from the original soundtrack. The first, "Back to the Lab" by Prince Paul, debuted on August 16 on Cartoon Network's Cartoon Cartoon Fridays block, which was entirely devoted to Dexter's Laboratory that night. Two more followed: "Dexter (What's His Name?)" by Coolio and "Secrets" by will.i.am. To further promote the soundtrack, an advertisement for it was shown before The Powerpuff Girls Movie during its theatrical run and on its home media releases. Ads for the album also appeared in commercials for Cartoon Network and in hip-hop magazines such as The Source and Urb. Promotions included Dexter's Laboratory trading cards, books, and Game Boy products.

== Reception ==
Professional ratings
Review scores
Source	Rating
AllMusic	4.5/5 stars
Rolling Stone	3/5 stars
The Village Voice	A−

Heather Phares of AllMusic gave the album a positive review, stating that "its only drawback is that it's so short."

== Track listing ==
=== Album ===
No.	Title	Writer(s)	Producer(s)	Length
1.	"Dexter's Laboratory Opening Theme"	Steve Rucker; Thomas Chase		0:33
2.	"Secrets" (performed by will.i.am)	will.i.am	will.i.am	3:18
3.	"Dexter (What's His Name?)" (performed by Coolio)	Artis Ivey; Josefa Salinas; Victor Concepcion	Victor Concepcion; Coolio	3:36
4.	"Love According to Dexter" (performed by Phife Dawg introducing Slick & Rose)	Malik Taylor; Dion Liverpool	DJ Rasta Root	3:53
5.	"Sibling Rivalries" (performed by De La Soul)	Kelvin Mercer; David Jolicoeur; Vincent Mason	Kelvin Mercer; David Jolicoeur; Vincent Mason	3:28
6.	"Mandark's Plan" (performed by YZ)	Anthony Hill	YZ; Fried Green	3:30
7.	"Back to the Lab" (performed by Prince Paul)	Prince Paul	Prince Paul	2:54

=== 7'' Green Vinyl Single ===
A side

No.	Title	Writer(s)	Producer(s)	Length
1.	"Dexter's Laboratory Opening Theme"	Steve Rucker; Thomas Chase		0:33
2.	"Secrets" (performed by will.i.am)	will.i.am	will.i.am	3:18

B side

No.	Title	Writer(s)	Performer(s)	Length
1.	"Back to the Lab" (performed by Prince Paul)	Prince Paul	Prince Paul	2:54
