= IV: Blazing Hot =

Studio album by Nice & Smooth
- Released: October 28, 1997
- Recorded: 1996–1997
- Genre: Hip hop
- Length: 37:33
- Label: Street Life/Scotti Brothers/BMG Records; 72392-75534
- Producer: Greg Nice; Smooth B. DJ Premier; Easy Mo Bee; Kid Capri

Nice & Smooth chronology
Jewel of the Nile (1994)	IV: Blazing Hot (1997)

Professional ratings
Review scores
Source	Rating
Allmusic	4/5 stars

IV: Blazing Hot, the fourth and final studio album by hip-hop duo Nice & Smooth. It was released on October 28, 1997, by Scotti Brothers Records and was produced by Greg Nice, Smooth B., DJ Premier, Easy Mo Bee, and Kid Capri. It received some positive reviews, but was not commercial success. It reached #75 on the Top R&B/Hip-Hop Albums chart, while one single, "Blazing Hot", made it to the charts, #21 on the Hot Rap Singles.

== Track listing ==
No.	Title	Length
1.	"Blazing Hot"	2:37
2.	"NY (intro)"	0:09
3.	"Boogie Down Bronx / BK Connection" (feat. Rappin' Is Fundamental)	4:03
4.	"I'll Be Good to You"	4:13
5.	"Let It Go"	3:21
6.	"Lockdown"	3:34
7.	"Scared Money"	4:24
8.	"Hot Shit"	3:11
9.	"Mad Love"	3:23
10.	"Same Old Brand New Style (I Can't Wait)"	4:36
11.	"Busta Rhymes Intro"	1:20
12.	"DWYCK (live)"	2:42
Total length:		37:33

== Samples ==
- "Let It Go"
  - "Piano in the Dark" by Brenda Russell
- "Blazing Hot"
  - "Get Out of My Life, Woman" by The Mad Lads
  - "Sad Song" by Amanda Ambrose
- "Lockdown"
  - "Impeach the President" by The Honeydrippers
- "Same Old Brand New Style (I Can't Wait)"
  - "I Can't Wait" by Nu Shooz
