= Get Your Freak On =

Live album by Rare Essence
- Released: 1995
- Recorded: November 25, 1994
- Venue: Rhythms Nightclub; Landover, Maryland
- Genre: Go-go; hip hop
- Length: 54:33
- Label: Sounds of the Capital; Liaison
- Producer: Andre Johnson; Michael Neal

Rare Essence chronology
Greatest Hits, Vol. 1 (1995)	Get Your Freak On (1995)	Body Snatchers (1996)

Professional ratings
Review scores
Source	Rating
Allmusic	3/5 stars
ARTISTdirect	3/5 stars

Get Your Freak On is a live album released in 1995 by the Washington, D.C.-based go-go band Rare Essence. The album was recorded live at the Rhythms Nightclub in Landover, Maryland on November 25, 1994.

== Track listing ==
Side A

1. "Get Your Freak On" – 8:59
2. "Holy Ghost" (written by James Banks, Eddie Marion, Henderson Thigpen) – 7:23
3. "Down 4 Whatever" – 3:01
4. "Turn Off the Lights" (written by Kenny Gamble) – 7:17

Side B

1. "Gonna Getcha Girl" – 8:11
2. "Uh Oh (Heads Up)" – 14:40
3. "Get Your Freak On" (studio version)– 5:02

== Personnel ==
- Michael "Funky Ned" Neal – bass guitar
- Milton "Go-Go Mickey" Freeman – congas, timbales
- Leslie "Big L" McKenzie – drums
- John "J.B." Buchanan – flugabone, keyboards
- Derek Paige – flugelhorn, trumpet
- Andre "Whiteboy" Johnson – electric guitar, vocals
- Mark "Godfather" Lawson – keyboards
- Donnell Floyd – saxophone, vocals
- Charles "Shorty" Garris – vocals
