= Ain't a Damn Thing Changed =

Studio album by Nice & Smooth
- Released: September 3, 1991
- Recorded: 1990–1991
- Studio: Unique (New York City); Power Play (Long Island City)
- Genre: Hip hop
- Length: 41:15
- Label: Rush; Columbia
- Producer: Gregg Nice; Smooth Bee; Louie Vega

Nice & Smooth chronology
| Nice & Smooth (1989) | Ain't a Damn Thing Changed (1991) | Jewel of the Nile (1994) |

Singles from Ain't a Damn Thing Changed
- 1. "Sometimes I Rhyme Slow" Released: 1991; 2. "Hip Hop Junkies" Released: 1991; 3. "How to Flow" Released: 1991; 4. "Cake & Eat It Too" Released: 1991

Professional ratings
Review scores
| Source | Rating |
|---|---|
| AllMusic | 4.5/5 stars |

Ain't a Damn Thing Changed is the second studio album by American hip-hop duo Nice & Smooth. It was released on September 3, 1991, via Rush Associated Labels and Columbia Records. The recording sessions took place at Unique Recording Studios and Power Play Studios in New York City. It was produced by Gregg Nice and Smooth Bee, except "Paranoia", produced by Louie Vega. Ain't a Damn Thing Changed spawned four singles: "Sometimes I Rhyme Slow", "Hip Hop Junkies", "How to Flow" and "Cake & Eat It Too".

== Track listing ==
All music is composed by Gregg Nice & Smooth Bee, except track 5 composed by Louie Vega with co-production by Nice & Smooth.

| No. | Title | Length |
|---|---|---|
| 1. | "Harmonize" | 3:33 |
| 2. | "Cake & Eat It Too" | 3:48 |
| 3. | "Down the Line" (featuring Preacher Earl, Melo T, Bās Blasta, Asu & GuRu) | 4:17 |
| 4. | "Sometimes I Rhyme Slow" | 2:52 |
| 5. | "Paranoia" | 4:46 |
| 6. | "Sex, Sex, Sex" | 3:40 |
| 7. | "Billy-Gene" | 1:06 |
| 8. | "How to Flow" (featuring Pure Blend) | 4:25 |
| 9. | "Hip Hop Junkies" (featuring Pure Blend) | 3:29 |
| 10. | "One, Two and One More Makes Three" | 3:24 |
| 11. | "Pump It Up" | 2:43 |
| 12. | "Step by Step" (featuring Kisha Black & the Black Flames) | 3:19 |
| Total length: | | 41:15 |

== Chart history ==
| Chart (1991) | Peak position |
|---|---|
| US Billboard 200 | 141 |
| US Top R&B/Hip-Hop Albums (Billboard) | 29 |
