= Live in 2004 =

Live album by Rare Essence
- Released: August 3, 2004
- Venue: The Classics Nightclub; Suitland, Maryland
- Genre: Go-go; hip-hop
- Length: 55:44
- Label: Rare One; Liaison
- Producer: Andre Johnson

Rare Essence chronology
| Live @ Club U, Volume II (2003) | Live in 2004 (2004) | Live PA#6 (2004) |

Live in 2004 is a live-double album released on August 3, 2004, by the Washington, D.C.–based go-go band Rare Essence. The album was recorded live at The Classics Nightclub in Suitland, Maryland, and consists of an audio CD of the concert, and a video DVD of the same concert.

== Track listing ==
Disc 1: Live at the Classics (audio CD version)
| No. | Title | Writer(s) | Length |
|---|---|---|---|
| 1. | "I Like It" | Andre Johnson; Charles Garris | 4:32 |
| 2. | "Where My Gangstas?" | Andre Johnson; Dave Ellis; Kent Wood; Michael Baker; Roy Battle; Charles Garris | 8:33 |
| 3. | "Don't Trip" | Dave Ellis; Kent Wood; Michael Baker; Charles Garris | 4:40 |
| 4. | "Dirt off Your Shoulder" | Shawn Carter; Timothy Mosley | 3:58 |
| 5. | "Hands High" | Clifford Smith; Haldane Browne | 10:04 |
| 6. | "Niggas That We Roll With" | Dave Ellis; Kent Wood; Michael Baker; Roy Battle; harles Garris | 6:43 |
| 7. | "Get Up" | Dave Ellis; Kent Wood; Charles Garris | 3:50 |
| 8. | "Damn!" | Cedric Leonard; Jeffrey Grisby; Jonathan Smith; Robert McDowell; Sean Paul Joseph | 8:30 |
| 9. | "Get Up (studio version)" | Dave Ellis; Kent Wood; Charles Garris | 4:40 |

Disc 2: Live at the Classics (video DVD version)
| No. | Title | Writer(s) | Length |
|---|---|---|---|
| 1. | "I Like It" | Andre Johnson; Charles Garris | 4:32 |
| 2. | "Where My Gangstas?" | Andre Johnson; Dave Ellis; Kent Wood; Michael Baker; Roy Battle; Charles Garris | 8:33 |
| 3. | "Don't Trip" | Dave Ellis; Kent Wood; Michael Baker; Charles Garris | 4:40 |
| 4. | "Dirt off Your Shoulder" | Shawn Carter; Timothy Mosley | 3:58 |
| 5. | "Hands High" | Cifford Smith; Haldane Browne | 10:04 |
| 6. | "Niggas That We Roll With" | Dave Ellis; Kent Wood; Michael Baker; Roy Battle; harles Garris | 6:43 |
| 7. | "Get Up" | Dave Ellis; Kent Wood; Charles Garris | 3:50 |
| 8. | "Damn!" | Cedric Leonard; Jeffrey Grisby; Jonathan Smith; Robert McDowell; Sean Paul Joseph | 8:30 |

== Personnel ==
- Andre "Whiteboy" Johnson – lead guitar, vocals
- Michael Baker – bass guitar
- Milton "Go-Go Mickey" Freeman – congas, percussions
- Quentin "Shorty Dud" Ivey – percussions
- Mike "Lil Mike" Smith – drums
- Kent "Hot Dog" Wood – keyboards
- Roy "RB" Battle – keyboards, trombone
- Quentin "Shorty Dud" Ivey – rototoms, timbales
- Dave "32" Ellis – vocals
- Charles "Shorty" Garris – vocals
