= Live @ the Zanzibar =

Live album by Rare Essence
- Released: May 12, 2009
- Recorded: March 18, 2009
- Venue: Zanzibar on the Waterfront; Washington, D.C.
- Genre: Go-go; hip-hop
- Length: 72:18
- Label: Rare One; Liaison
- Producer: Andre Johnson

Rare Essence chronology
Live @ the Tradewinds (2007)	Live @ the Zanzibar (2009)	Live @ the D.C. Star (2010)

Live @ the Zanzibar (also titled as Live PA#11: Live @ the Zanzibar) is a live album released on May 12, 2009, by the Washington, D.C.–based go-go band Rare Essence. The album was recorded live on March 18, 2009, at the now defunct music venue "Zanzibar on the Waterfront", formerly located in Southwest, Washington, D.C.

== Track listing ==
1. "Intro" – 0:46
2. "Hey Young World" – 4:36
3. "Miss Independent" – 8:56
4. "All the Way to Heaven" – 9:22
5. "Party Lights" – 7:27
6. "Blame It" – 7:56
7. "Happy Birthday" – 7:29
8. "Move If You Wanna" – 6:25
9. "Show Off" – 7:33
10. "Ur Lookin Luvable" – 6:31
11. "Got Money" – 5:17
