= How to Flow =

1991 single by Nice & Smooth

Single by Nice & Smooth

from the album Ain't a Damn Thing Changed
- Released: 1991
- Genre: Hip hop
- Length: 4:25
- Label: Rush Associated Labels; Columbia
- Songwriter(s): Gregory Mays; Darryl Barnes
- Producer(s): Nice & Smooth

Nice & Smooth singles chronology
"Hip Hop Junkies" (1991)	"How to Flow" (1991)	"Cake and Eat It Too" (1991)

Music video
- "How to Flow" on YouTube

"How to Flow" is a song by American hip hop duo Nice & Smooth and the third single from their second studio album Ain't a Damn Thing Changed (1991). It contains a sample of "Woman to Woman" by Joe Cocker. The song was featured in the soundtrack to the 1991 film Strictly Business.

== Composition ==
The drums in the song's production have been noted as similar to those in "Give the Drummer Some" by Dee Felice Trio. During the chorus, the instrumental uses piano sampled from "Woman to Woman".

== Critical reception ==
Angus Batey of The Quietus described "How to Flow" as "peerless, mighty" and commented it was "largely ruined by a needless remix". He believed the "strangest thing" about the song is that "it is basically an elaborate homage to the Ultramagnetic MCs. Kool Keith and co may be the key to unlocking the mysteries of the east coast's golden age - De La were fans, so were the Bomb Squad - but the idea that they'd be the prime sonic influence on what is clearly, on many levels, a pop record seems ridiculous. Yet the evidence is all there in the grooves of this addictively daft song." Additionally, Batey stated the drums give the track "that sleazy underground rawness".

== Charts ==
Chart (1992)	Peak position
US Hot R&B/Hip-Hop Songs (Billboard)	23
US Hot Rap Songs (Billboard)	5
