= Love Deluxe =

1992 studio album by Sade

Studio album by Sade
- Released: 26 October 1992
- Recorded: 1992
- Studios: Condulmer (Venice, Italy); Ridge Farm (Surrey, England); The Hit Factory (London); Image Recording (Los Angeles)
- Genres: R&B; ambient; cool jazz; art pop; trip hop; chill-out
- Length: 45:47
- Label: Epic
- Producer: Sade

Sade chronology
Stronger Than Pride (1988)	Love Deluxe (1992)	The Best of Sade (1994)

Singles from Love Deluxe
- 1. "No Ordinary Love" Released: 28 September 1992; 2. "Feel No Pain" Released: 16 November 1992; 3. "Kiss of Life" Released: 26 April 1993; 4. "Cherish the Day" Released: 19 July 1993

Love Deluxe is the fourth studio album by English band Sade, released by Epic Records in October 1992 in the United Kingdom and November 1992 in the United States. It differs from Sade's previous three albums by using modernised recording and production techniques. Love Deluxe features a "lush" aesthetic and lyrics about the complexities of love and loss.

Love Deluxe peaked in the top ten of several countries and received generally positive reviews from critics, who praised its performances, sound and themes. It appears in several lists of the best albums of the 1990s and of all time, including Rolling Stone's "500 Greatest Albums of All Time" and Apple Music's "100 Best Albums".

== Background and recording ==
During 1992, the members of Sade – Sade Adu, Stuart Matthewman, Paul Denman, and Andrew Hale – re-entered the studio after a break following the supporting tour for their previous album Stronger Than Pride (1988). The band worked on Love Deluxe for four months. Adu explained that the album's title comes from her concept of love: "The idea is that it's one of the few luxury things that you can't buy," she said in an interview at the time of the album's release. "You can buy any kind of love but you can't get love deluxe." On the songwriting process, she added: "I collect ideas in my head all the time. The things that most depress you are often the things that you write about."

== Music and lyrics ==
Love Deluxe marks a shift in Sade's signature sound, straying from their previous live instrumentation – notably almost no live drumming – in favour of a modernised and programmed aesthetic with "lush" production. The album primarily blends the R&B, ambient, and cool jazz genres.

Critics noted the "menacing" and metal-like riffs on the opening track, "No Ordinary Love". Track two, "Feel No Pain", lyrically depicts unemployment woes. Notes of deep house appear on track three, "I Couldn't Love You More". Track four, "Like a Tattoo", was inspired by the story of a war veteran Adu met in a Manhattan bar. "Kiss of Life", track five, was compared to a jazzy Motown groove. Saxophone instrumentation "fills the margins" on track eight, "Bullet Proof Soul".

Pitchfork writer Ivy Nelson described the sound of Love Deluxe as swelling with "darkness", comparing the "yawn and lurch" of its programmed beats to the burgeoning trip hop genre and noting its art pop and chill-out elements. "The band plays with an almost fluid dynamism, audible in the oceanic churn of Matthewman's guitar on 'No Ordinary Love,' or in the way Hale's synth work tends to add long, drowsy auras to his piano chords," Nelson says. "The distance between snare hits on songs like 'No Ordinary Love' and 'Cherish the Day' seems to open a space in which lushness and dread merge."

== Release ==
Love Deluxe was released in the United Kingdom on 26 October 1992, and in the United States on 3 November 1992; both releases were handled by Epic Records. Following its release, the band had a seven-year hiatus, during which Adu came under media scrutiny with rumours of depression and addiction and later gave birth to her first child. During this time, Matthewman, Denman, and Hale pursued other projects and formed the band Sweetback, which released a self-titled album in 1996. Matthewman also provided instrumentation and production work for the first two albums by American R&B singer Maxwell.

== Critical reception ==
Professional ratings
Review scores
Source	Rating
AllMusic	4/5 stars
Entertainment Weekly	B
Los Angeles Times	2.5/4 stars
NME	7/10
Pitchfork	9.3/10
The Rolling Stone Album Guide	3/5 stars
Select	3/5
Uncut	4/5 stars
USA Today	3/4 stars
The Village Voice	B−

Love Deluxe peaked at number 10 on the UK Albums Chart, and was certified gold by the British Phonographic Industry (BPI) on 1 June 1993. In the United States, the album peaked at number three on the Billboard 200, and as of May 2003, it had sold 3.4 million copies. The Recording Industry Association of America (RIAA) certified it four-times platinum on 9 November 1994, denoting shipments in excess of four million copies. The album was also commercially successful elsewhere, reaching number one in France and the top 10 in Belgium, Italy, Japan, the Netherlands, New Zealand, Portugal, Spain, Sweden, and Switzerland. By April 1993, the album had sold three million copies worldwide, including 220,000 copies in Italy.

In a contemporary review for The Village Voice, music critic Robert Christgau felt that half of Love Deluxe cannot qualify with Sade's most memorable songs and particularly panned the lyric about a Somali woman who "hurts like brand-new shoes" in the song "Pearls". Los Angeles Times journalist Dennis Hunt said that while some songs "make good romantic background music", others resemble lesser imitations of "Enya's ultra-soothing mood music." Amy Linden of Entertainment Weekly stated that the album "surges with emotion, but the mostly lush ambient music on Love Deluxe is low on the oomph meter." James T. Jones IV was more enthusiastic in USA Today, commenting that it "may frustrate those who want to hear something truly different" from Sade, but would satisfy fans with its "quasi-jazz moods, light Afro-Latin undercurrents and minimalist arrangements". Writing for NME, David Quantick found Love Deluxe not "much different" from Sade's previous work, yet still "a fine album" having "proper tunes and neat arrangements", and "the soul of subtlety." In Rolling Stone, Mark Coleman deemed Adu an "exacting" lyricist and Love Deluxe an "artfully arranged and tastefully executed album" that "repays the time it takes to grow on you."

Retrospectively, AllMusic's Ron Wynn wrote that Love Deluxe "marked a return to the detached cool jazz backing and even icier vocals that made her debut album a sensation" with an "urbane" sound. Chris Roberts of Uncut viewed it as a culmination of Sade's increasingly minimalist musical direction, remarking that "by Love Deluxe, the understatement had attained Zen". In the 2004 Rolling Stone Album Guide, Roni Sarig noted that it introduced "subtle divergences" to Sade's standard style, with "No Ordinary Love" in particular pointing to the band's later shift "toward the sleeker, more digital sound of modern British pop." Ivy Nelson highlighted the "monolithic" nature and "blissful abstraction" of the album's sound, as well as its "timeless expressions of desire and heartache", in a 2017 review for Pitchfork.

== Legacy ==
In 2022, Pitchfork listed Love Deluxe as the 52nd best album of the 1990s. In 2020, Rolling Stone ranked Love Deluxe 247th on its list of the "500 Greatest Albums of All Time". In 2024, Apple Music ranked Love Deluxe number 61 on its "100 Best Albums" list.

== Track listing ==
No.	Title	Writer(s)	Length
1.	"No Ordinary Love"	Sade Adu; Stuart Matthewman	7:20
2.	"Feel No Pain"	Adu; Andrew Hale; Matthewman	5:08
3.	"I Couldn't Love You More"	Adu; Hale; Matthewman; Paul S. Denman	3:49
4.	"Like a Tattoo"	Adu; Hale; Matthewman	3:38
5.	"Kiss of Life"	Adu; Matthewman; Hale; Denman	5:50
6.	"Cherish the Day"	Adu; Hale; Matthewman	5:34
7.	"Pearls"	Adu; Hale	4:34
8.	"Bullet Proof Soul"	Adu; Matthewman; Hale	5:26
9.	"Mermaid"	Hale; Adu; Matthewman; Denman	4:23
Total length:			45:47

== Personnel ==
Credits adapted from the liner notes of Love Deluxe.

Sade

- Paul S. Denman – bass
- Sade Adu – vocals
- Andrew Hale – keyboards
- Stuart Matthewman – guitars, saxophone

Additional musicians

- Leroy Osbourne – vocals
- Martin Ditcham – drums (track 5); percussion (tracks 1, 5)
- Nick Ingman – string arrangements (tracks 5, 7)
- Gavyn Wright – orchestra leader
- Tony Pleeth – solo cello (track 7)

Technical

- Sade – production, arrangements
- Mike Pela – co-production, engineering
- Chris Lord-Alge – engineering, mixing (track 9)
- Sandro Franchin – engineering assistance
- Adrian Moore – engineering assistance
- Marc Williams – engineering assistance
- Stephen Marcussen – mastering

Artwork

- Albert Watson – photography
- Peter Brawne – design
- Quest Typesetting – production

== Charts ==
=== Weekly charts ===
1992–1993 weekly chart performance for Love Deluxe
Chart (1992–1993)	Peak position
Australian Albums (ARIA)	13
Austrian Albums (Ö3 Austria)	11
Belgian Albums (IFPI)	3
Canada Top Albums/CDs (RPM)	16
Dutch Albums (Album Top 100)	10
European Albums (Music & Media)	2
Finnish Albums (Suomen virallinen lista)	11
French Albums (SNEP)	1
German Albums (Offizielle Top 100)	14
Greek Albums (IFPI)	4
Hungarian Albums (MAHASZ)	38
Italian Albums (Musica e dischi)	2
Japanese Albums (Oricon)	10
New Zealand Albums (RMNZ)	5
Portuguese Albums (AFP)	4
Spanish Albums (AFYVE)	6
Swedish Albums (Sverigetopplistan)	7
Swiss Albums (Schweizer Hitparade)	6
UK Albums (Official Charts)	10
US Billboard 200	3
US Top R&B/Hip-Hop Albums (Billboard)	2

2024–2026 weekly chart performance for Love Deluxe
Chart (2024–2026)	Peak position
Belgian Albums (Ultratop Flanders)	33
Belgian Albums (Ultratop Wallonia)	43
Croatian International Albums (HDU)	32
Greek Albums (IFPI)	14
Lithuanian Albums (AGATA)	81
Norwegian Physical Albums (IFPI Norge)	7
Polish Albums (ZPAV)	100
Portuguese Streaming Albums (AFP)	136

=== Year-end charts ===
1992 year-end chart performance for Love Deluxe
Chart (1992)	Position
Canada Top Albums/CDs (RPM)	94
Italian Albums (Musica e dischi)	44
Swedish Albums (Sverigetopplistan)	58

1993 year-end chart performance for Love Deluxe
Chart (1993)	Position
Australian Albums (ARIA)	87
European Albums (Music & Media)	34
German Albums (Offizielle Top 100)	68
Italian Albums (Musica e dischi)	40
New Zealand Albums (RMNZ)	24
Spanish Albums (AFYVE)	48
US Billboard 200	12
US Top R&B/Hip-Hop Albums (Billboard)	3

1994 year-end chart performance for Love Deluxe
Chart (1994)	Position
US Top R&B/Hip-Hop Albums (Billboard)	51

== Certifications and sales ==
Certifications and sales for Love Deluxe
Region	Certification	Certified units/sales
Australia (ARIA)	Platinum	70,000^{^}
Belgium (BRMA)	Gold	25,000^{*}
Canada (Music Canada)	Platinum	100,000^{^}
Denmark (IFPI Danmark)	Gold	10,000^{‡}
France (SNEP)	Platinum	300,000^{*}
Germany (BVMI)	Gold	250,000^{^}
Italy	—	220,000
Japan (RIAJ)	Platinum	200,000^{^}
Netherlands (NVPI)	Gold	50,000^{^}
New Zealand (RMNZ)	Gold	7,500^{^}
Spain (Promusicae)	2× Platinum	200,000^{^}
Sweden (GLF)	Gold	50,000^{^}
Switzerland (IFPI Switzerland)	Gold	25,000^{^}
United Kingdom (BPI)	Gold	120,000
United States (RIAA)	4× Platinum	3,400,000
^{*} Sales figures based on certification alone.^{^} Shipments figures based on certification alone.^{‡} Sales+streaming figures based on certification alone.
