= Roun' the Globe =

2003 single by Nappy Roots

Single by Nappy Roots

from the album Wooden Leather
- Released: August 5, 2003
- Recorded: 2003
- Genre: Hip-hop
- Length: 4:03
- Label: Atlantic
- Songwriter: Nappy Roots
- Producer: Mike City

Nappy Roots singles chronology
"Headz Up" (2002)	"Roun' the Globe" (2003)	"Sick & Tired" (2003)

"Roun' the Globe" is the lead single by the Kentucky rap group Nappy Roots from their second studio album, Wooden Leather. The song peaked at number 96 on the U.S. pop chart. It was featured in the soundtrack for Madden NFL 2004 (the only place where the word "damn" is censored in the song; usually it is uncensored).

== Track listing ==
1. "Roun' the Globe" (explicit)
2. "Po Folks" (Josh One remix)
3. "Roun' the Globe" (slump mix explicit)

== Chart positions ==
Chart	Peak position
U.S. Billboard Hot 100	96
U.S. Billboard Hot R&B/Hip-Hop Songs	53
U.S. Billboard Hot Rap Tracks	25

== Remixes ==
The official remix was done along with the Ying Yang Twins.
