= Live @ the D.C. Star =

Live album by Rare Essence
- Released: June 15, 2010
- Recorded: April 17, 2010
- Venue: The D.C. Star; Washington, D.C.
- Genre: Go-go; hip-hop
- Length: 74:27
- Label: Rare One; Liaison
- Producer: Andre Johnson

Rare Essence chronology
Live @ the Zanzibar (2009)	Live @ the D.C. Star (2010)	Live @ the Tradewinds (2011)

Live @ the D.C. Star (also titled as Live PA #12: Live @ the D.C. Star) is a live album released on June 15, 2010, by the Washington, D.C.–based go-go band Rare Essence. The album was recorded live on April 17, 2010, at the D.C. Star, a music venue located in Northeast, Washington, D.C.

== Track listing ==
1. "Intro" – 0:29
2. "Looks Like She Want It" – 2:38
3. "Do It Like This (Fire, Fire)" – 10:37
4. "R.E.F." – 3:17
5. "Where They At" – 4:36
6. "You Not Ready" – 6:32
7. "Hit It from the Back" – 7:38
8. "Clap if it's Good" – 8:39
9. "Don't Say No" – 10:29
10. "All Da Time" – 3:24
11. "Down for My Niggas" – 5:50
12. "Loveable" – 6:14
13. "What It Do?" – 4:04
