= So What You Want? =

Studio album by Rare Essence
- Released: December 12, 1995
- Recorded: January 12, 1994
- Venue: The Eastside Club, Washington, D.C.
- Genre: Go-go; hip hop
- Length: 61:42
- Label: Rare One; Sounds of the Capital
- Producer: Andre Johnson; Darren Frazier; Donnell Floyd

Rare Essence chronology
Work the Walls (1992)	So What You Want? (1995)	Greatest Hits, Vol. 1 (1995)

So What You Want? is a studio album released on December 12, 1995, by the Washington, D.C.–based go-go band Rare Essence.

== Track listing ==
Side A (The Studio)

1. "Go All Out" – 5:45
2. "So What You Want?" – 5:58
3. "Must Be Like That" – 4:45
4. "Bitch Nigga" – 3:35
5. "Come Back" – 7:06

Side B (Live at the Eastside Club)

1. "Must Be Like That" (featuring Doug E. Fresh) – 6:47
2. "Where They At?" – 2:26
3. "And Uhh" – 3:52
4. "Where My Troopers At?" – 9:00
5. "So What You Want?" – 5:06
6. "20 Minute Workout" – 7:22

== Personnel ==
- Charles "Shorty Corleone" Garris – vocals
- Andre "Whiteboy" Johnson – electric guitar, vocals
- Michael "Funky Ned" Neal – bass guitar
- Donnell Floyd – vocals, saxophone
- Kent Wood – keyboards
- Milton "Go-Go Mickey" Freeman – congas, percussion
- Derick Paige – trumpet, vocals
