= Innerstate Music =

Mixtape by Nappy Roots
- Released: July 31, 2007 (U.S.)
- Genre: Alternative hip hop, Southern hip hop
- Label: Nappy Roots Entertainment Group; Rush City

Nappy Roots chronology
Wooden Leather (2003)	Innerstate Music (2007)	The Humdinger (2008)

Innerstate Music is a mixtape by the American hip hop group Nappy Roots, released July 31, 2007. Their first as independent artists, Inner state is an Internet mixtape/album which had been intended to precede The Humdinger until that album experienced several delays. "Good Day" is played in the 2016 film The Secret Life of Pets during the scene where a bunch of pets are partying in Buddy's apartment.

== Track listing ==
1. "Keep It Real"
2. "Good Day"
3. "Do It Like That"
4. "Sell It"
5. "Who Got It, Where's It At"
6. "Bottles 'N Broads"
7. "Swerve & Lean"
8. "Sun Don't Shine"
9. "Sometimes" (featuring D. Folks)
10. "Shakers to the Stage"
11. "Hot" (Produced by Chi Duly)
12. "Souljahs"
13. "Dreamin'" (featuring Tenia Sanders)
14. "On My Way to G.A."
