= The Pursuit of Nappyness =

Studio album by Nappy Roots
- Released: June 15, 2010
- Recorded: 2008–2010
- Studio: Tree Sound Studios (Norcross, Georgia); Clutch's House; DJ K.O.'s Crib; Scotch Bonnet; Solar Sound Studios; The Phivestarr Mansion
- Genre: Southern hip hop
- Length: 1:01:07
- Label: Nappy Roots Entertainment Group
- Producer: Paul Diaz (exec.); Sheldon "Dutch" John (also exec.); CHOPS; Cloud9; D. Focis; DJ KO; Ellie Perry; Je'Kob Washington; LX; Nikolai Prange; PhiveStarr; Q Smith; SMKA; Silent Riot; Sol Messiah

Nappy Roots chronology
The Humdinger (2008)	The Pursuit of Nappyness (2010)	Nappy Dot Org (2011)

Professional ratings
Review scores
Source	Rating
HipHopDX	3.5/5 stars
RapReviews	8/10 stars
Slant Magazine	3/5 stars

The Pursuit of Nappyness is the fourth studio album by American hip hop quintet Nappy Roots from Kentucky. It was released on June 15, 2010 under Nappy Roots Entertainment Group record label's partnership with Fontana Distribution. The album features guest appearances from Aleon Craft, CHOPS and Je'kob Washington.

== Track listing ==
No.	Title	Producer(s)	Length
1.	"Welcome to the Show"	Cloud9; Silent Riot (add.)	3:53
2.	"Do It Big"	D. Focis	3:34
3.	"Fishbowl"	PhiveStarr; DJ KO; Ellie Perry (add.)	4:09
4.	"Be Alright" (featuring Je'kob Washington)	Je'Kob Washington	4:08
5.	"Infield"	PhiveStarr; DJ KO; Nikolai Prange (add.)	4:03
6.	"How I Do"	CHOPS	3:38
7.	"The People"	Q Smith	4:15
8.	"Ride"	PhiveStarr; DJ KO	3:15
9.	"Live & Die"	Sol Messiah	3:07
10.	"Back Home"	PhiveStarr; DJ KO	4:08
11.	"Know Bout Me" (featuring Aleon Craft)	CHOPS	4:23
12.	"Right Place, Right Time"	Elijah "LX" Harvey	3:38
13.	"Winner Take All"	PhiveStarr; DJ KO	3:52
14.	"Paint a Picture" (featuring CHOPS)	CHOPS	4:05
15.	"P.O.N."	SMKA	3:25
16.	"All 4 You"	CHOPS	3:34
Total length:			1:01:07

== Personnel ==
- William Rahsaan Hughes – main artist
- Melvin Adams – main artist
- Ronald Wilson – main artist
- Brian Scott – main artist
- Vito Jermaine Tisdale – main artist
- Scott Robert Jung – featured artist (track 14), additional vocals (track 11), producer (tracks: 6, 11, 14, 16)
- Marcus "Aleon Craft" Thomas – featured artist (track 11), additional vocals (track 15)
- Je'kob Washington – featured artist & producer (track 4)
- Elizabeth Woodward – additional vocals (tracks: 10, 13)
- Penelope Magnet – additional vocals (track 12)
- Ellie Perry – additional vocals (track 3)
- Jess Evans – acoustic guitar (track 10)
- DJ KO – producer (tracks: 3, 5, 8, 10, 13)
- PhiveStarr – producer (tracks: 3, 5, 8, 10, 13)
- Elijah "LX" Harvey – producer (track 12)
- Ernest Franklin – producer (track 9)
- D. Focis – producer (track 2)
- Q. Smith – producer (track 7)
- Cloud 9 – producer (track 1)
- Nikolai Prange – additional producer (track 5)
- Silent Riot – additional producer (track 1)
- Sheldon "Dutch" John – executive producer
- Paul Diaz – executive producer
- Blake Harden – engineering
- Vance Vexed – engineering
- Randall Lumpkin – mastering
- Chris V. Weeks – project manager
- Laboris Louden – art direction, layout
- Warren Griffin, Jr. – A&R
- Ellen Chamberlain – A&R

== Charts ==
Chart (2010)	Peak position
US Top R&B/Hip-Hop Albums (Billboard)	40
US Top Rap Albums (Billboard)	21
US Independent Albums (Billboard)	48
