= Blazing Hot =

1997 single by Nice & Smooth

Single by Nice & Smooth

from the album IV: Blazing Hot
- Released: 1997
- Genre: Hip hop
- Length: 2:35
- Label: Street Life/Scotti Brothers/BMG Records
- Songwriter(s): Gregory Mays; Darryl Barnes
- Producer(s): Nice & Smooth

Nice & Smooth singles chronology
"Do You Wanna Get Funky (Vocal Club Mix)" (1994)	"Blazing Hot" (1997)	"Let It Go" (1997)

Music video
- "Blazing Hot" on YouTube

"Blazing Hot" is a song by American hip hop duo Nice & Smooth and the lead single from their fourth and final studio album IV: Blazing Hot (1997). It samples "Get Out of My Life, Woman" by The Mad Lads and "Sad Song" by Amanda Ambrose.

== Background ==
Nathan Rabin of AllMusic gave a positive review, describing the song as "nicely illustrating their still-potent knack for catchy choruses".

== Charts ==
Chart (1997)	Peak position
US Hot R&B/Hip-Hop Songs (Billboard)	76
US Hot Rap Songs (Billboard)	21
