= Po' Folks (Nappy Roots song) =

Single by Nappy Roots featuring Anthony Hamilton

from the album Watermelon, Chicken & Gritz
- Released: July 10, 2002
- Recorded: 2001
- Genre: Southern hip-hop; alternative hip-hop
- Length: 4:15
- Label: Atlantic
- Songwriter: Nappy Roots
- Producer: TrackBoyz

Nappy Roots featuring Anthony Hamilton singles chronology
| "Awnaw" (2001) | "Po' Folks" (2002) | "Headz Up" (2002) |

"Po' Folks" is a 2002 song by the Kentucky-based hip-hop group Nappy Roots, featuring fellow Southern act, singer Anthony Hamilton. Released on July 10 of that year by Atlantic Records, it served as the second single from their second studio album Watermelon, Chicken & Gritz. The song peaked at number 21 on the Billboard Hot 100 and earned two Grammy Award nominations—Best Rap/Sung Collaboration and Best Long Form Music Video.

== Overview ==
The beat was produced by Trackboyz. The song's signature concept, verse, and chorus was written by R. Prophet, a prolific member of Nappy Roots. Discussing the meaning of "Po' Folks", Prophet told MTV.com that the lyrics did not only speak of being poor as an economic issue. "It's a state of mind. It's not so bad being poor when you've got your family and God in your life and you have different values that, when it comes down to it, matter. A lot of other things really don't matter when God is knocking at your door". "Po' Folks" was released in 2002 and taken from Nappy Roots's debut album, Watermelon, Chicken & Gritz. It peaked at number 21 in the U.S. and features vocals by Anthony Hamilton who sung the soulful hook.

Anthony Hamilton's performance, as well as the success of the song, is credited for launching Anthony Hamilton's career in mainstream music.

== Remix ==
The official remix is called, "Po' Folks (Collipark Remix)", and features the Ying Yang Twins. It was produced by Mr. Collipark.

== Charts ==
=== Weekly charts ===
| Chart (2002) | Peak position |
|---|---|
| US Billboard Hot 100 | 21 |
| US Hot R&B/Hip-Hop Songs (Billboard) | 13 |
| US Hot Rap Songs (Billboard) | 10 |
| US Rhythmic Airplay (Billboard) | 14 |

=== Year-end charts ===
| Chart (2002) | Position |
|---|---|
| US Hot R&B/Hip-Hop Songs (Billboard) | 64 |

== Awards and nominations ==
=== 2003 ===
- 2003 Grammy Award nominations for Best Rap/Sung Collaboration.
