= Feel No Pain =

1992 single by Sade

Single by Sade

from the album Love Deluxe
- B-side: "Love Is Stronger Than Pride" (Mad Professor remix)
- Released: 16 November 1992
- Genre: Funk
- Length: 5:08
- Label: Epic
- Songwriter(s): Sade Adu; Andrew Hale; Stuart Matthewman
- Producer(s): Sade

Sade singles chronology
"No Ordinary Love" (1992)	"Feel No Pain" (1992)	"Kiss of Life" (1993)

Music video
- "Feel No Pain" on YouTube

"Feel No Pain" is a song by English band Sade from their fourth studio album, Love Deluxe (1992). Written and produced by the band, it was released as the album's second single on 16 November 1992 by Epic Records, as the follow-up to their highly successful "No Ordinary Love". "Feel No Pain" peaked at number 56 on the UK Singles Chart, and numbers 59 and 44 on the US Billboard Hot R&B/Hip-Hop Songs chart and the Cash Box Top 100 R&B Singles chart.

== Critical reception ==
Larry Flick from Billboard magazine complimented "Feel No Pain" as a "luscious slow jam" and "by far, the album's most accessible cut." He explained, "A creative shuffle beat is embellished with subtle and bluesy guitar picking and steamy keyboard passages. Of course, Sade's unique voice is the focal point at all times." Andrew Smith from Melody Maker said, "Sade fashions a polite modern soul, sterile and stripped of ambiguity." A reviewer from Music & Media wrote, "Laid back but nonetheless driven, the second single from the Love Deluxe album is not completely painless, because the repetitive bass pattern makes you tap your feet until they hurt, especially through Nellee Hooper's dance remix."

== Retrospective response ==
In a 2017 retrospective review, Justin Chadwick from Albumism described the song as a "percussive" and "compassionate call-to-arms that reminds us to treat the poverty-stricken with the dignity and decency they deserve, while encouraging us to do what we can to ease people's suffering in times of financial turmoil and family upheaval." In 2010, the Daily Vault's Mark Millan said that it "comes off as a cool, breezy, and somewhat groovy funk song." He also noted "the icy vocals [that] are in complete contrast with the club-ready, slow-burning track."

Frank Guan from Vulture wrote, "All Sade songs are socially engaged at some level, but of the ones that directly reference politics, this is one of the best. Instead of telling the story of a black family trapped by layoffs, poverty, unemployment, and hatred from the third-person, Sade locates herself within its daughter as a first-person narrator. Her intimation that a society that refuses to support its least fortunate members will end in ruin for all doesn't come off as a sermon, but an experience deeply lived. The supporting cast turns in one of its best performances, evoking a spirit at once buoyant, concerned, and trapped."

== Track listings ==
- UK and European 7-inch single

A. "Feel No Pain" – 5:08
B. "Love Is Stronger Than Pride" (Mad Professor remix) – 4:25

- US 7-inch single

A. "Feel No Pain" – 3:45
B. "Love Is Stronger Than Pride" (Mad Professor remix) – 4:25

- UK and European 12-inch single

A1. "Feel No Pain" (Nellee Hooper remix) – 5:09
A2. "Feel No Pain" (album version) – 5:07
B1. "Love Is Stronger Than Pride" (Mad Professor remix) – 4:25
B2. "Feel No Pain" (Nellee's bonus beats) – 3:12

- European CD single / Japanese mini CD single / US and Dutch cassette single
1. "Feel No Pain" – 3:47
2. "Love Is Stronger Than Pride" (Mad Professor remix) – 4:27
- UK and European CD maxi single
1. "Feel No Pain" (album version) – 5:08
2. "Love Is Stronger Than Pride" (Mad Professor remix) – 4:25
3. "Feel No Pain" (version) – 5:29
- UK CD single – Nellee Hooper Mixes
1. "Feel No Pain" (Nellee Hooper remix) – 5:09
2. "Feel No Pain" (album version) – 5:07
3. "Love Is Stronger Than Pride" (Mad Professor remix) – 4:25
4. "Feel No Pain" (Nellee's bonus beats) – 3:12

== Charts ==
Chart performance for "Feel No Pain"
Chart (1992–1993)	Peak position
Australia (ARIA)	107
Europe (European Dance Radio)	20
Germany (GfK)	80
Italy (Musica e dischi)	20
New Zealand (Recorded Music NZ)	48
UK Singles (OCC)	56
UK Club Chart (Music Week)	52
US Hot R&B/Hip-Hop Songs (Billboard)	59
US Top 100 R&B Singles (Cash Box)	44
