= Body Snatchers (Rare Essence album) =

Studio album by Rare Essence
- Released: August 1, 1996
- Genre: Go-go; hip hop
- Length: 65:06
- Label: Sounds of the Capital; Liaison; Rare One
- Producer: Andre Johnson; Donnell Floyd

Rare Essence chronology
Get Your Freak On (1995)	Body Snatchers (1996)	We Go On and On (1998)

Body Snatchers is a studio album released on August 1, 1996 by the Washington, D.C.-based go-go band Rare Essence. The album peaked at No. 60 Billboard's Top R&B/Hip-Hop Albums on September 28, 1996.

== Track listing ==
Studio Side

1. "Welcome to the Show" – 5:50
2. "Body Snatchers" – 6:03
3. "Somebody's Been Funkin with R.E." – 5:19
4. "One Two" – 6:45
5. "No Bang No More" – 5:22

Live Side

1. "If You Feel it's Real" – 7:12
2. "Call My Name" – 6:16
3. "All da Time" – 7:12
4. "Body Snatchers" – 7:48
5. "Go Down Baby" – 7:19

== Personnel ==
- Charles "Shorty Corleone" Garris – vocals
- Andre "Whiteboy" Johnson – electric guitar, vocals
- Michael "Funky Ned" Neal – bass guitar
- Donnell Floyd – vocals, saxophone
- Kent Wood – keyboards
- Milton "Go-Go Mickey" Freeman – congas, percussion
