= Work the Walls =

Studio album by Rare Essence
- Released: July 7, 1992
- Studios: Sigma Sound, Philadelphia, Pennsylvania; Bias Studios
- Genres: Go-go; hip hop
- Length: 71:26
- Label: Sounds of the Capital
- Producers: Donnell Floyd; Mike Neal

Rare Essence chronology
Live at Celebrity Hall (1987)	Work the Walls (1992)	So What You Want? (1995)

Professional ratings
Review scores
Source	Rating
AllMusic	3/5 stars
Robert Christgau	(1-star Honorable Mention)

Work the Walls is a studio album released on July 7, 1992, by Washington, D.C.–based go-go band Rare Essence. The album consist of thirteen tracks, including the charting singles "Work the Walls" and "Lock It" (which was originally released on the soundtrack to the film Strictly Business).

== Track listing ==
No.	Title	Writer(s)	Length
1.	"Spot Light"		5:31
2.	"Lock It"	Micheal Neal; J. Karen Thomas	4:55
3.	"Work the Walls"	Derek Floyd	5:08
4.	"I Got That Feeling"	R. Clark; Derek Floyd	4:07
5.	"Sheraina"		5:41
6.	"Give Me That Beat"	Derek Floyd	4:17
7.	"Niggaz"	Derek Floyd	4:50
8.	"Hey Tamika"		5:05
9.	"One on One"		5:35
10.	"Party Goin' On"	Derek Floyd; M. Johnson	5:36
11.	"Make 'Em Move Mick"		4:21
12.	"Lock It (Dub)"	Derek Floyd	7:40
13.	"Work the Walls (Live)"	Derek Floyd	7:42
Total length:			71:26

== Personnel ==
- Charles "Shorty Corleone" Garris – vocals
- Andre "Whiteboy" Johnson – electric guitar, vocals
- Michael "Funky Ned" Neal – bass guitar
- Donnell Floyd – vocals, saxophone
- Kent Wood – keyboards
- Milton "Go-Go Mickey" Freeman – congas, percussion
- Derick Paige – trumpet, vocals
