= RE-2000 =

Studio album by Rare Essence
- Released: 1999
- Genre: Go-go; hip hop
- Length: 65:30
- Label: Rare One; Liaison
- Producer: Rare Essence

Rare Essence chronology
| We Go On and On (1998) | RE-2000 (1999) | Turn It Up (2016) |

RE-2000 is a studio album released in 1999 by the Washington, D.C.-based go-go band Rare Essence.

== Track listing ==
1. "Intro" – 3:36
2. "We Push" (featuring – Redman) – 5:55
3. "Keep it Real" – 0:21
4. "RE-2000" – 4:16
5. "What Nigga What?" – 6:34
6. "Dinner Anyone?" – 1:28
7. "Hoodrat" (featuring Ms. Kim) – 6:59
8. "Where are You Now?" (featuring Tony Blunt) – 5:02
9. "R.E. Unplugged" – 0:46
10. "As if You Where Mine" – 3:56
11. "Chillin' in the Hood" – 0:20
12. "Party in My Neighborhood" – 4:44
13. "Too Much Goin' On" – 0:20
14. "Beam is on Your Head" – 4:24
15. "Damn Right" - 3:51
16. "Captain Brady" – 0:17
17. "How Can I Know?" – 5:05
18. "Thank You" – 7:30

== Personnel ==
- Byron "BJ" Jackson – keyboards
- Andre "White Boy" Johnson – electric guitar, vocals,
- Kent Wood – keyboards
- Redman – guest vocals
- Eric Butcher – timbales
- Donnell Floyd – saxophone, vocals
- Adebayo "De De" Folarin – vocals
- Kimberly "Ms. Kim" Graham – vocals
- Tony Blunt – vocals
