= Wooden Leather =

Studio album by Nappy Roots
- Released: August 26, 2003 (U.S.)
- Studios: Emerald Sound Studios (Nashville, Tennessee); Skip Saylor Recording (California); Tree Sound Studios (Norcross, Georgia); Unsung Studios; QDIII Soundlab (Los Angeles, California); Blakeslee Recording Company (West Hollywood, California); Larrabee West (West Hollywood, California); Manhattan Center Studios (Manhattan, New York); Cherokee Studios (Los Angeles, California); The Zone (Atlanta, Georgia)
- Genre: Southern hip hop
- Length: 1:09:44
- Label: Atlantic
- Producers: Kevin Mitchell (exec.); Mike Caren (also exec.); Mike City; Freddie "Mac" McIntosh; Raphael Saadiq; David Banner; Jake and the Phatman; Needlz; Troy Johnson; Briss; Brian Kidd; Kanye West; Mr. DJ; Sol Messiah; Lil' Jon; Organic

Nappy Roots chronology
Watermelon, Chicken & Gritz (2002)	Wooden Leather (2003)	The Humdinger (2008)

Singles from Wooden Leather
- 1. "Roun' the Globe" Released: August 5, 2003

Professional ratings
Aggregate scores
Source	Rating
Metacritic	(79/100)
Review scores
Source	Rating
AllMusic	4/5 stars
Blender	3/5 stars
Entertainment Weekly	A−
PopMatters	8/10 stars
RapReviews	(8.5/10)
Rolling Stone	3/5 stars
Spin	(6/10)
USA Today	3/4 stars
Vibe	4/5 stars

Wooden Leather is the second studio album by American hip hop sextet Nappy Roots from Kentucky. It was released on August 26, 2003 via Atlantic Records. Recording sessions took place at Tree Sound and The Zone in Atlanta, at Emerald Sound Studios in Nashville, at QDIII Soundlab, Blakeslee Recording Company, Larrabee West and Cherokee Studios in Los Angeles, at Manhattan Center Studios in New York City, at Skip Taylor Recording and at Unsung Studios. The production was handled by several high-profile record producers such as David Banner, Jake and the Phatman, Kanye West, Lil Jon, Mike Caren, Mike City, Mr. DJ, Needlz, Raphael Saadiq, along with Brian Kidd, Briss, Freddie "Mac" McIntosh, Organic, Sol Messiah, Troy Johnson, Mr. Collipark and Kevin Freeman. It features guest appearances from Anthony Hamilton, Raphael Saadiq, Aura J, Benjamin "Black" Bush, and the Ying Yang Twins.

The album peaked at number 12 on the Billboard 200 and at number 9 on the Top R&B/Hip-Hop Albums chart in the United States. Its lead single, "Roun' the Globe" featuring background vocals from Black of Playa, made it to #96 on the Billboard Hot 100 singles chart.

== Track listing ==
No.	Title	Writer(s)	Producer(s)	Length
1.	"Intro"		Freddie "Mac" McIntosh	0:31
2.	"Good God Almighty"	Khari Cain; William Hughes; Ronald Wilson; Vito Tisdale; Kenneth Anthony; Brian Scott; Melvin Adams	Needlz	4:23
3.	"Nappy Roots Day"	Lavell Crump; Tisdale; Wilson; Anthony; Scott; Hughes; Barry Gibb; Robin Gibb	David Banner	4:05
4.	"Roun' the Globe" (featuring Black)	Michael Flowers; Hughes; Scott; Tisdale; Anthony; Adams; Wilson	Mike City	4:04
5.	"Lac Dogs & Hogs"	Troy Johnson; Hughes; Wilson; Scott; Tisdale; Anthony	Troy Johnson	4:21
6.	"Sick & Tired" (featuring Anthony Hamilton & Aura J)	Freddie McIntosh; Kevin Freeman; Hughes; Tisdale; Wilson; Anthony; Scott; Adams	Freddie "Mac" McIntosh; Kevin Freeman (co.); Mike Caren (add.)	4:21
7.	"Twang"	Andre Brissett; Tisdale; Scott; Hughes; Anthony	Briss	4:07
8.	"Leave This Morning" (featuring Raphael Saadiq)	Raphael Saadiq; Bobby Ozuna; Glenn Standridge; Hughes; Wilson; Scott; Tisdale; Anthony; Adams	Raphael Saadiq; Jake & the Phatman (co.)	4:17
9.	"Work in Progress"	Saadiq; Ozuna; Standridge; Wilson; Scott; Tisdale	Raphael Saadiq; Jake & the Phatman	4:36
10.	"Push On" (featuring Anthony Hamilton)	Flowers; Scott; Adams; Tisdale	Mike City	3:58
11.	"No Good"	Brian Kidd; Tisdale; Adams	Brian Kidd	5:15
12.	"These Walls"	Kanye West; Scott; Tisdale; Adams	Kanye West	3:53
13.	"War/Peace"	Crump; Tisdale; Wilson; Anthony; Scott; Hughes	David Banner	4:19
14.	"Roll Again" (featuring Aura J)	Mr. DJ; Tisdale; Hughes; Adams; Scott; Homer Banks; Carl Hampton; Raymond Jackson	Mr. DJ; Sol Messiah	4:15
15.	"What Cha Gonna Do? (The Anthem)"	Jonathan Smith; Tisdale; Adams; Hughes; Anthony	Lil Jon	4:08
16.	"Light & Dark" (featuring Anthony Hamilton)		Organic	4:24
17.	"Outro"		Freddie "Mac" McIntosh	0:39
18.	"Roun' the Globe (Collipark Remix)" (featuring Ying-Yang Twins)	Flowers; Hughes; Scott; Tisdale; Anthony; Adams; Wilson; Michael Crooms; Deongelo Holmes; Eric Jackson	Mike City; Beat In Azz	4:08
Total length:				1:09:44

European version bonus
No.	Title	Length
19.	"Behind the Scenes of Wooden Leather"	6:50

Sample credits

- "Good God Almighty" contains excerpts from "Don't Rip Me Off", performed by Tennyson Stephens.
- "Nappy Roots Day" contains excerpts from "Holiday", written by Barry Gibb and Maurice Gibb, and performed by the Bee Gees.
- "Roll Again" contains excerpts from "(If Loving You Is Wrong) I Don't Want to Be Right"; written by Homer Banks, Carl Hampton, and Raymond Jackson; and performed by Millie Jackson.

== Charts ==
Chart (2003)	Peak position
US Billboard 200	12
US Top R&B/Hip-Hop Albums (Billboard)	9
