= Turn It Up (Rare Essence album) =

Studio album by Rare Essence
- Released: May 6, 2016
- Genre: Go-go; hip hop
- Length: 42:02
- Label: Rare One
- Producer: Andre Johnson

Rare Essence chronology
RE-2000 (1999)	Turn It Up (2016)

Turn It Up is a studio album released on 6 May 2016, by the Washington, D.C.–based go-go band Rare Essence. The album is the band's first studio album since the release of RE-2000.

== Track listing ==
1. "VIP" – 3:28
2. "Turn It Up" (featuring DJ Kool) – 3:41
3. "Tryna Go" (featuring Raheem DeVaughn and Dee Boy) – 3:39
4. "Hold Me Down" (featuring Ms Kim) – 3:53
5. "How Sexy Can You Get" (featuring Jas Funk) – 4:38
6. "It's On Tonight" – 4:03
7. "How I Wish You Could Love Me" (featuring Kacey Williams) – 3:31
8. "You're The Only One" (featuring Art Sherrod) – 3:38
9. "Think You Betta" – 4:12
10. "Fly Shyt (Cal's Freestyle)" – 3:01
11. "She Can't Help It" (featuring Art Sherrod and Michael Muse) – 4:18
