= Slick & Rose =

American pop/new wave/R&B music duo

- Origin: Atlanta
- Genres: Pop, New Wave, R&B
- Years active: 2000-2011
- Labels: Soul Hippie Music Group, LLC
- Members: Nikki "Slick" Ervin; Sabrina "Rose" Harvey

Slick & Rose was an Atlanta-based pop, new wave and R&B duo that formed in 2000. The duo was composed of Nikki "Slick" Ervin, from Mobile, Alabama, and Sabrina "Rose" Harvey, from New York City.

== History ==
They have opened for and/or performed with musicians including Common, Kindred The Family Soul, Phife Dawg, Angie Stone, Sugarland, Vivian Green, Scratch, Donnie, Joi, Slum Village, Nappy Roots, Edwin McCain, Van Hunt, Chingy, DJ Drama, Janelle Monáe, Dead Prez, John Legend and Kanye West.

== Awards ==
- Teen Diaries Online Featured Artist
- MAYBELLINE/JANE Magazine 2007 Reader-Produced CD Winners
- Billboard Magazine's Breakout Act of 2005
- Creative Loafing Magazine's Best Atlanta R&B/Soul Act
- Black Girls Rock! Award, presented by Atlanta's premier tastemakers
- MySpace Music Artist of the Week

== Tour appearances ==
- Okayplayer/Black Lilly Tour, Japan
- Common – One Day It Will All Make Sense Tour, USA

== Discography ==
- 2003: Objects in the Mirror
- 2007: Winter Spells, Vol. 1 Mixtape
- TBD: Ambitious Intellectuals

== Compilations/guest appearances ==
- "Move Your Body" and "Ain't Nothing Gonna Stop Us" - MoBonics
- "Welcome to Atlantis" - Wordslife: A Thin Line between Poetry and Hip-hop - Aqiyl
- "Dance, Groove" - 2003 - Vintage Vegetarians - Proton
- DJ Drama Automatic Relaxation Mix CD 4 - 7
- "What'cha know about the LRG?" - LRG Magic Show Compilation
- "Can You Stand the Reign?" - The Reign Begins
- "Milk and Honey" feat. D.R.E.S tha Beatnik - Have Mic…Will Travel: The Live Experience
- "Love According to Dexter" - Dexter's Laboratory: The Hip Hop Experiment - Phife Dawg (A Tribe Called Quest)
- "You Know You Want It" - Phife Dawg (A Tribe Called Quest)
- Hennessey Compilation
- Fader Magazine's Suite 903 Compilation mixed by DJ Drama
- MySpace Hip-Hop Compilation, Vol. 1
- MAYBELLINE/JANE Magazine Reader-Produced CD
- "California Dreaming" and "Pole Position" - The Humdinger - Nappy Roots
- Information Age - dead prez - date TBD

== Films ==
Slick & Rose's music has been featured in the award-winning films Premium and Yellow.
