= Nappy Roots =

American alternative rap band

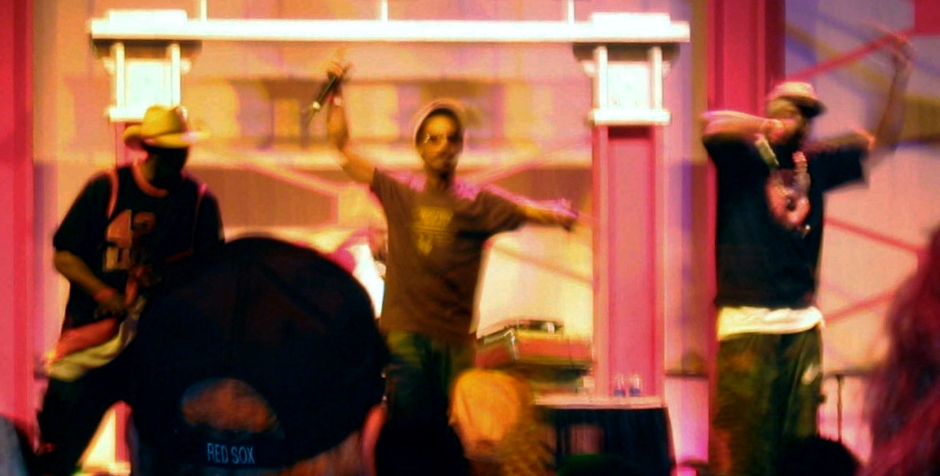
- Nappy Roots performing at the 2004 NBA All-Star Jam Session in Los Angeles

Background information
- Origin: Bowling Green, Kentucky, U.S.
- Genres: Southern hip-hop
- Years active: 1995–present
- Labels: Atlantic; Nappy Roots Entertainment Group; Fontana Distribution; AVJ Records
- Members: Skinny DeVille; B. Stille; Ron Clutch; Fish Scales
- Past members: R. Prophet; Big V
- Website: nappyroots.com

Nappy Roots is an American alternative Southern rap group. The group met in Bowling Green, Kentucky, in 1995 while attending Western Kentucky University. They have worked with Rob Run Corleone of Empire Distribution. On the South Rituals mixtape. They are best known for their hit singles "Po' Folks", "Awnaw", "Roun' the Globe" and "Good Day". The group consists of Milledgeville, Georgia, native Fish Scales and Kentucky natives Skinny DeVille, B. Stille and Ron Clutch.

R. Prophet exited the group in 2006, followed by Big V, who left in 2012 to focus on their solo careers.

== Biography ==
The group formed when the members were students at Western Kentucky University. Nappy Roots' debut independent album Country Fried Cess was released in 1998, which led to the group being signed by Atlantic Records. Their first album on Atlantic was 2002's best selling hip-hop album, Watermelon, Chicken & Gritz. The multi-platinum album featured the hit-singles "Headz Up", "Awnaw", and "Po' Folks". The "Awnaw (Remix)" featuring Marcos of P.O.D. appeared on Madden 2003.

In their home state, Paul E. Patton, the governor of Kentucky, sanctioned September 16 as "Nappy Roots Day".

Their next and last album with Atlantic Records was Wooden Leather, released in 2003, featuring the singles "Roun' the Globe", which was featured on Madden 2004, and "Sick and Tired" (featuring Anthony Hamilton). This critically acclaimed, major label follow-up album featured production from Kanye West, David Banner and Lil Jon. Also in 2003, Nappy Roots were on the soundtrack to Daredevil, with the song "Right Now", which featured Marcos Curiel of P.O.D. and was released on Windup Records. In 2004, three songs by Nappy Roots were included in the movie soundtrack to The Ladykillers, released on Sony Music.

Since the release of Wooden Leather they have gone back to being independent artists, and have started their own label, N.R.E.G. (Nappy Roots Entertainment Group) with distribution through Fontana/Universal Music Group. On July 31, 2007, they released their first album as independent artists, Innerstate Music, featuring singles "Good Day" and "Keep It Real". This was actually an internet album, similar to a modern-day mixtape. It was intended to be a precursor to their 2008 album, The Humdinger, which was released on August 5, 2008.

In 2007 Nappy Roots was featured on the original version of the Tantric song titled "Fall Down". The song had originally been intended for Tantric's album Tantric III, but due to the album being shelved, the song went unreleased. However, Tantric did re-record the song for their 2008 album The End Begins. The version featuring Nappy Roots can only be found on YouTube.

The critically acclaimed album The Humdinger features guest appearances from Anthony Hamilton, Greg Nice, Greg Street and Slick & Rose, with production from Sol Messiah, James "Groove" Chambers, BIG AL 360, Joe Hop and more. The album entered the Billboard Rap Charts at No. 7 and R&B/Hip-Hop Albums at No. 13.

In 2009 the single "We're Gonna Make it" by Skinny and Scales was released through Nappy Roots Entertainment Group.

Nappy Roots kicked off 2010 with their highly anticipated new album, The Pursuit of Nappyness, released on June 15, 2010. The album features songs by Phivestarr Productions, a production duo from Atlanta, Georgia.

In 2011, Nappy Roots teamed up with hip hop producers Organized Noize to create Nappy Dot Org. The first single, "Congratulations", was made available online on July 13, 2011, by way of XXL Magazine and 2DopeBoyz. On October 11, 2011, Nappy Roots released Nappy Dot Org, entirely produced by Organized Noize.

The Nappy Roots Presents Sh!ts Beautiful album/mixtape was released on June 27, 2012, through AllHipHop.

In 2015, Nappy Roots released their most recent album, The 40 Akerz Project. In August 2017, "Good Day" was on President Barack Obama's summertime playlist. In 2018, the Cincinnati Bengals featured Nappy Roots song "Good Day" in their promotional video "Seize the DEY". They also released a single at the same year together with Vitas called "Roll With the Beat".

== Singles ==
Year	Song	Chart positions				Album
Year	Song	US	US R&B/HH	US Rap	US Pop	Album
2002	"Awnaw" (featuring Jazze Pha)	51	18	15	—	Watermelon, Chicken & Gritz
2002	"Po' Folks" (featuring Anthony Hamilton)	21	13	10	25	Watermelon, Chicken & Gritz
2002	"Headz Up"	—	88	—	—	Watermelon, Chicken & Gritz
2003	"Roun' The Globe"	96	53	25	—	Wooden Leather
2004	"Trouble of this World (Coming Home)"	—	—	—	—	The Ladykillers
2008	"Good Day"	—	80	—	—	The Humdinger
2008	"Down 'N Out" (featuring Anthony Hamilton)	—	91	—	—	The Humdinger
2010	"Ride"	—	—	—	—	The Pursuit of Nappyness
2011	"Congratulations"	—	—	—	—	Nappy Dot Org
2011	"Hey Love"	—	57	—	—	Nappy Dot Org
2012	"Another Sofa Bed" (featuring Audio Stepchild)	—	—	—	—	Nappy Roots Presents Sh!t's Beautiful
2012	"Bigga Thomas" (featuring 40 Akerz)	—	—	—	—	Nappy Roots Presents Sh!t's Beautiful
2018	"Keep The Crypt" (Anything But Broke featuring Nappy Roots)	—	—	—	—	The Start EP
2018	"Roll With The Beat" (Vitas featuring Nappy Roots)	—	—	—	—	Roll With The Beat EP

== Discography ==
=== Studio albums ===
Album information
Watermelon, Chicken & Gritz
- RIAA Certification: Platinum
- Released: February 26, 2002
- Billboard 200 chart position: #24
- R&B/Hip-Hop chart position: #3
- Singles: "Awnaw", "Po' Folks", "Headz Up"
Wooden Leather
- RIAA Certification:
- Released: August 26, 2003
- Billboard 200 chart position: #12
- R&B/Hip-Hop chart position: #9
- Singles: "Roun' the Globe", "Sick and Tired"
The Humdinger
- Release: August 5, 2008
- Billboard 200 chart position: #73
- R&B/Hip-Hop chart position: #13
- Rap chart position: #7
- Top Independent Albums: #11
- Singles: "Good Day", "Down & Out"
The Pursuit of Nappyness
- Release: June 15, 2010
- Billboard 200 chart position: –
- R&B/Hip-Hop chart position: 40
- Rap chart position: 21
- Top Independent Albums: 48
- Singles: "Ride", "Be Alright", "Back Home"
Nappy Dot Org (with Organized Noize)
- Release: October 11, 2011
- Billboard 200 chart position: –
- R&B/Hip-Hop chart position: –
- Rap chart position: –
- Top Independent Albums: –
- Singles: "Congratulations", "Hey Love"
40Akerz Project
- Release: May 5, 2015
- Billboard 200 chart position: –
- R&B/Hip-Hop chart position: –
- Rap chart position: –
- Top Independent Albums: –
- Singles: "Tokyo", "Party for the Ages"
Another 40 Akerz
- Release: April 14, 2017
- Billboard 200 chart position: –
- R&B/Hip-Hop chart position: –
- Rap chart position: –
- Top Independent Albums: –
- Singles: "Lookin Grown"
40RTY+
- Release: July 30, 2021
- Billboard 200 chart position: –
- R&B/Hip-Hop chart position: –
- Rap chart position: –
- Top Independent Albums: –
- Singles:
NAPPY4LIFE, Pt. 1
- Release: October 20, 2023
- Billboard 200 chart position: –
- R&B/Hip-Hop chart position: –
- Rap chart position: –
- Top Independent Albums: –
- Singles:

=== Featured tracks ===
Song	Artist	Album	Year
"Bluegrass Stain'd"	Mark Ronson	Here Comes The Fuzz	2003
"K.K.K.Y-Remix"	Cunninlynguists	Strange Journey Volume One	2009
"The Man In Me"	Chase Bean	Revelry	2010
"Anti-Depression" & "Good Die Young"	Jacob Izrael	The Glitch 2.0	2010
"Election Day"	Jonathan Hay	Single	2011
"Sofa Bed"	Audio Stepchild	Every Coincidence Is Significant	2012
"Some Kentucky Bourbon On Christmas Eve"	1st Blood	A Different Kind Of Christmas	2012
"Snow Bunny" & "Holiday Wavy"	Jerome "Bigfoot" Brailey, Jonathan Hay	A Different Kind Of Christmas	2012
"White Shoes"	Kid Quill	94.3 The Reel	2017
"Roll With The Beat"	Vitas	Roll With The Beat EP	2018

=== Mixtapes ===
Mixtape information
Country Fried Cess
- Release: 1998
No Comb No Brush No Fade No Perm
- Release: 2000
The Leak
- Release: 2005
Nappy Roots Music Presents – The Kentucky Kolonels Vol. 1
- Release: 2006
90 In The Slow Lane
- Released: 2006
Innerstate Music
- Released: 2007
Cookout Muzik
- Released: 2008
Nappy University
- Released: 2010
Nappy University Vol. 2: Fall Semester
- Released: 2010
Nappy Roots Presents Sh!t's Beautiful
- Released: 2012

== Music videos ==
Year	Video	Director
2002	"Po' Folks" (w/ Anthony Hamilton)	
2002	"Awwnaw"	
2002	"Headz Up"	
2003	"Roun' The Globe"	
2008	"Good Day" (w/ DJ Greg Street)	
2011	"Waste Some Time"(w/ Colt Ford and Nic Cowan)	David Poag

== Awards and nominations ==
=== 2002 ===
- 2002 MTV Video Music Award nomination for the MTV2 Award for "Awnaw" – shared nomination with Jazze Pha

=== 2003 ===
- 2003 American Music Award nominations for Favorite Band, Duo or Group – Hip-Hop/R&B and Favorite New Artist – Hip-Hop/R&B
- 2003 Grammy Award nominations for Best Rap/Sung Collaboration for "Po' Folks" – shared nomination with Anthony Hamilton and Best Long Form Music Video for "The World According to Nappy" – shared nomination with Gloria Gabriel, director; David Anthony
- 2003 Soul Train Award nomination for Best R&B/Soul or Rap New Artist for "Awnaw"

=== 2008 ===
- 2008 HipHopDX Award for "The Humdinger"

=== 2011 ===
- 2011 SEA Award for "The Pursuit Of Nappyness" – Album of the Year nomination

== See also ==
- Afro-textured hair
