= Rare Essence =

American go-go band based in Washington, DC, formed in 1976

- Origin: Washington, D.C., United States
- Genres: Go-go; funk; hip hop
- Years active: 1976–present
- Labels: Groove; PolyGram; Uptown; MCA; Sounds of the Capital; Rare One
- Members: Andre "Whiteboy" Johnson; James "Jas.Funk" Thomas; Earl Vincent; Leroy "RB" Battle Jr; Michael Baker; Calvin "Killa Cal" Henry; Brion "BJ" Scott; Samuel "GoGo Smoke" Dews; Tabria Lampkin; Darrell "Blue eye" Arrington; Tony "Tony T" Chase Michael Arnold
- Past members: Quentin "Footz"Donnell Floyd Davidson; Meshell Ndegeocello; Anthony "Little Benny" Harley; Byron "B.J." Jackson
- Website: www.rareessence.com

Rare Essence is a Washington, D.C.–based go-go band formed in 1976. Rare Essence has been amongst the most prominent musicians of the D.C. music scene, producing numerous hit songs in the local D.C. market and several hits nationwide, including the charting hit "Work the Walls".

== History ==
=== Beginnings ===
Rare Essence was started in 1976 after childhood friends Quentin "Footz" Davidson, Andre "Whiteboy" Johnson, Michael "Funky Ned" Neal, and John Jones decided to form a band. After school, the band gathered in their basements to play Top 40 hits from such influential funk bands as Parliament-Funkadelic, Cameo, and Con Funk Shun in practice sessions.

Eventually, the band recruited more players and conformed to the go-go style and sound, which gained recognition in the mid-70s. Although the go-go beat was originated by Chuck Brown, Rare Essence originated the characteristic four-conga style played by all subsequent bands.

Once the direction of the band was settled, Rare Essence along with Chuck Brown, Trouble Funk and Experience Unlimited formed the basis for the emerging go-go scene. By 1979, their ability to draw consistent local crowds was well-established. As was the wide dispersal of bootleg tapes.

Many of the band's original members contributed to the D.C. style. One would be one of the most dynamic and influential performers on the go scene. Anthony Harley "Lil Benny" was on the way home from his weekly trumpet lesson when he heard the sound of a band coming from a nearby apartment building. After a brief audition, in which he performed the introduction to Kool & the Gang's "Hollywood Swinging", he was asked to join on the spot. Soon after, the band called on the assistance of Quentin's mother, Annie Mack, who became the band's first manager.

=== Present formation ===
Today, the band consists of twelve musicians who play a variety of instruments, from the timbales to the bass guitar. They perform up to six nights a week and travel throughout the country.

Rare Essence accomplished noteworthy successful hits as "Body Moves", the hit albums Live at Breeze's Metro Club, and Live at Celebrity Hall. In 1991, Rare Essence was offered a record deal by hip-hop producer Sean Combs and Andre Harrell (founder of Uptown Records), which resulted in the production of the single "Lock-It", which was featured on the soundtrack to the 1991 film Strictly Business. The band's most successful single, "Work the Walls", was released in 1992 and reached #68 in the US Billboard R&B chart.

In 1999, Rare Essence had some controversy regarding their song "Overnight Scenario", which was allegedly copied by Jay-Z in the song "Do It Again (Put Ya Hands Up)" and was the first single from his album, Vol. 3... Life and Times of S. Carter. There is an hour-to-hour account in the song "Overnight Scenario", and "Do It Again" follows the same concept. For example, Rare Essence's line was "Three in the Morning the Pancake House" while Jay-Z said "4 AM at the Waffle House". The question was whether or not the problem should be called plagiarism or just a similar concept. The group had been performing the song for most of the late 1990s and was concerned about the copyright infringement that seemingly took place. Jay–Z's defense was that go-go music is a remake of other artists' songs.

In 2009, Rare Essence performed at one of the inaugural balls. In 2012, the group collaborated with the Soul Rebels Brass Band during a Tribute to Chuck Brown on June 21, 2012, in Washington, D.C., at the historic Howard Theatre which is re-opened in April 2012. Slick Rick was also on the tribute show.

In 2018, Rare Essence collaborated with Ethiopian American singer Kelela, contributing a remix of her song "Take Me Apart" to her album Take Me a_Part, the Remixes.

=== Past members ===
Former drummer Quentin "Footz" Davidson was murdered on September 17, 1994, at the age of 33. Former band member Anthony Harley (Little Benny) died on May 30, 2010, in Washington, D.C., at the age of 46. Byron "B.J." Jackson died of cancer on September 4, 2016, at the age of 52. Former saxophonist Rory "DC" Felton was murdered on April 21, 2018, at the age of 57.

== Discography ==
=== Studio albums ===
- Work the Walls (1992)
- So What You Want? (1995)
- Let's Go Go Christmas (1995)
- Body Snatchers (1996)
- We Go On and On (1998)
- RE-2000 (1999)
- Turn It Up (2016)

=== Mixtape albums ===
- Mixtape, Vol. 1, Hosted by DJ Dirty Rico (2012)
- Mixtape, Vol. 2, Hosted by DJ Dirty Rico (2013)

=== Live albums ===
- Live at Breeze's Metro Club (1986)
- Go Go Live at the Capital Centre (1987)
- Live at Celebrity Hall / Live at the Metro Club (1987)
- Get Your Freak On (1995)
- Doin' It Old School Live at Club U (2001)
- Live PA #4 (Back at The Classics) (2002)
- Live at Club U, vol. 2 (featuring Doug E. Fresh & the Get Fresh Crew) (2003)
- Live in 2004 (2004)
- Live PA #6 Back at the Tradewinds (2004)
- Live PA #9 Live @ the Tradewinds (2007)
- Live PA #11 Live @ the Zanzibar (2009)
- Live PA #12 Live @ the D.C. Star (2010)
- Live PA #14 Live @ the Tradewinds (2011)
- Live PA #16 Live @ the Tradewinds (2013)
- The Reunion (Live at the Hyatt Regency) (2015)

=== Compilation albums ===
- Greatest Hits, Vol. 1 (1995)

=== Singles ===
- "Body Moves" (1981)
- "Back Up Against the Wall" (1983)
- "Shoo-Be-Do-Wop" (1984)
- "Give It Here" (1986)
- "Flipside" (1986)
- "Hey Now" (1988)
- "Lock It" (1991)
- "Work The Walls" (1992)
- "Must Be Like That" (1993)
- "Brothers / Comeback" (1993)
- "So What U Want?" (1994)
- "No Bang No More " (1996)
- "Body Snatchers" (1996)
- "Player Hater" (1997)
- "We Push" (featuring Redman) (1999)
- "Pieces of Me" (2004)
- "Turn It Up" (2016)
