= Awnaw =

Single by Nappy Roots

from the album Watermelon, Chicken & Gritz
- Released: December 4, 2001
- Recorded: 2001
- Genre: Hip-hop
- Length: 3:59
- Label: Atlantic
- Songwriters: Nappy Roots; James "Groove" Chambers
- Producer: James "Groove" Chambers

Nappy Roots singles chronology
"Awnaw" (2001)	"Po' Folks" (2002)

"Awnaw" is the first single by the Kentucky rap group Nappy Roots, produced by James "Groove" Chambers. It was released in 2001, taken from Nappy Roots's first album Watermelon, Chicken & Gritz (2002). It peaked at number 51 in the U.S. and features vocals by Jazze Pha who sang the hook and chorus. The instrumental portions are often used on the public radio program This American Life.

== Music video ==
The music video was released in 2002. The video for the rock remix was released later on that year.

== Remixes ==
The main official remix features Jazze Pha, Cam'ron and Twista and the second official remix is a rap rock remix featuring Jazze Pha and Marcos Curiel from P.O.D. who performs a guitar solo that was featured on the soundtrack of Madden 2003.

== Track listing ==
1. Radio edit
2. Album version
3. Instrumental
4. Acappella
5. Rock remix

== Charts ==
=== Weekly charts ===
Chart (2001–2002)	Peak position
US Billboard Hot 100	51
US Hot R&B/Hip-Hop Songs (Billboard)	18
US Rhythmic Airplay (Billboard)	19

=== Year-end charts ===
Chart (2002)	Position
US Hot R&B/Hip-Hop Songs (Billboard)	85
