= Headz Up =

Single by Nappy Roots

from the album Watermelon, Chicken & Gritz
- Released: November 26, 2002
- Recorded: 2002
- Genre: Hip-hop
- Length: 4:07
- Label: Atlantic
- Songwriter: Nappy Roots

Nappy Roots singles chronology
"Po' Folks" (2001)	"Headz Up" (2002)	"Roun' the Globe" (2003)

"Headz Up" is the third single by the American alternative Southern rap sextet Kentucky rap group Nappy Roots, from their 2002 debut album Watermelon, Chicken & Gritz.

== Chart positions ==
Chart	Peak position
U.S. Billboard Hot R&B/Hip-Hop Songs	88
