= Mixtape, Vol. 1 (Rare Essence album) =

Mixtape, Vol. 1: Hosted by DJ Dirty Rico

Remix album by Rare Essence
- Released: April 17, 2012
- Genre: Go-go; hip-hop
- Length: 68:23
- Label: Rare One; Liaison

Rare Essence chronology
Mixtape, Vol. 1: Hosted by DJ Dirty Rico (2012)	Mixtape, Vol. 2 (2013)

Mixtape, Vol. 1 (also titled as Mixtape, Vol. 1: Hosted by DJ Dirty Rico) is a remix album released on April 17, 2012, by the Washington, D.C.–based go-go band Rare Essence. The album was compiled and remixed by DJ Dirty Rico. The follow-up album Mixtape, Vol. 2 was released on July 2, 2013.

== Track listing ==
No.	Title	Length
1.	"Comeback"	2:35
2.	"Player Hater"	2:55
3.	"All Da Time"	1:02
4.	"We Push" (featuring Redman)	3:49
5.	"Mr. Big Stuff"	3:21
6.	"D.E.F." (featuring Doug E Fresh)	2:02
7.	"Freaky Deak"	1:30
8.	"You Not Ready"	2:38
9.	"DJ Rico Interlude" (featuring DJ Dirty Rico)	0:13
10.	"And Ah"	1:23
11.	"Shoo-Be-Do-Wop"	1:37
12.	"Body Moves"	2:23
13.	"Holy Ghost"	4:37
14.	"One Too Many Drinks"	2:51
15.	"RE Get Busy One Time"	1:05
16.	"Go Go Mickey"	1:04
17.	"Goodie Mob"	4:28
18.	"Freaks Come Out at Night"	1:06
19.	"Party, Party"	1:26
20.	"And Ah (revisited)"	1:25
21.	"RAR–EE–SSEN–CE"	0:21
22.	"Ain't No Party"	0:44
23.	"Where My Troopers At?"	1:26
24.	"Are You the Bomb?"	2:01
25.	"Make 'em Bounce"	0:23
26.	"Clap, If It's Good"	2:09
27.	"Clap, If It's Good" (featuring Killa Cal and DJ Rico)	4:37
28.	"Cherchez La R.E." (featuring Ms. Kim)	1:26
29.	"Hoodrat"	1:14
30.	"Price Tag"	2:06
31.	"20 Minute Workout"	1:04
32.	"You Not Ready" (featuring Killa Cal)	2:50
33.	"Call My Name"	4:32
Total length:		68:23

== Personnel ==
Adapted from AllMusic

- DJ Rico – compilation producer, DJ, mixing, vocals
- Rare Essence – primary artist
- Doug E. Fresh – guest artist
- Kimberly "Ms. Kim" Graham – guest artist
- Killa Cal – featured artist
- Redman – guest artist
- Dave "32" Ellis – guest artist
