= Sometimes I Rhyme Slow =

1991 single by Nice & Smooth

Single by Nice & Smooth

from the album Ain't a Damn Thing Changed
- Released: 1991
- Genre: Hip hop
- Length: 2:52
- Label: Rush Associated Labels; Columbia
- Songwriter(s): Gregory Mays; Darryl Barnes; Tracy Chapman
- Producer(s): Nice & Smooth

Nice & Smooth singles chronology
"Funky for You" (1990)	"Sometimes I Rhyme Slow" (1991)	"Hip Hop Junkies" (1991)

Music video
- "Sometimes I Rhyme Slow" on YouTube

"Sometimes I Rhyme Slow" is a song by American hip hop duo Nice & Smooth and the lead single from their second studio album Ain't a Damn Thing Changed (1991). It contains a sample of "Fast Car" by Tracy Chapman.

== Composition ==
The production uses a sample of the acoustic guitar intro to "Fast Car" accompanied with drums. The lyrics make references to drug abuse, guns and violence. Greg Nice performs the first verse, while Smooth B performs the second verse, which revolves around him being in love with a cocaine addict who relapses after 18 months in rehab.

== Critical reception ==
Stanton Swihart of AllMusic commented the song has an "insanely catchy vocal hook". Angus Batey of The Quietus wrote of the song, "A deceptively - even outrageously - simple idea, it would have bridged the gap between the PE and De La crowds admirably." In addition, he described Smooth B's verse as "so out of character you're never too sure how real it is", suggesting it could be an "elaborate set-up for the self-deprecating punchline", but "there is detail in the writing that, allied with the innate melancholia of the Chapman sample, makes it feel like it comes from somewhere that's recalled rather than studied."

== Charts ==
Chart (1992)	Peak position
US Billboard Hot 100	44
US Hot R&B/Hip-Hop Songs (Billboard)	17
US Hot Rap Songs (Billboard)	1
