= We Go On and On =

Studio album by Rare Essence
- Released: May 26, 1998
- Recorded: March 10, 1998
- Genre: Go-go; hip hop
- Length: 62:25
- Label: Rare One; Liaison
- Producer: Rare Essence

Rare Essence chronology
| Body Snatchers (1996) | We Go On and On (1998) | RE-2000 (1999) |

We Go On and On is a studio album released on May 26, 1998 by the Washington, D.C.-based go-go band Rare Essence.

== Track listing ==
A-Side

| No. | Title | Length |
|---|---|---|
| 1. | "Concentration (Intro)" | 2:04 |
| 2. | "Player Haters" | 6:34 |
| 3. | "What Would U Do for the Money?" | 4:37 |
| 4. | "Stranded" | 0:46 |
| 5. | "Overnight Scenario" | 4:56 |
| 6. | "Super Chicken" | 0:42 |
| 7. | "Make 'em Bounce" | 4:40 |
| 8. | "Freaks Come Out at Night" (featuring D.J. Flexxx) | 6:23 |

B-Side

| No. | Title | Length |
|---|---|---|
| 1. | "Freaks" (featuring D.J. Flexxx) | 4:18 |
| 2. | "Tell Me What U Want (1998)" | 5:10 |
| 3. | "Greatest Hits" | 0:28 |
| 4. | "We Go On and On" (featuring DJ Kool) | 6:00 |
| 5. | "Cab Confessions" | 0:30 |
| 6. | "Stars Be Partyin'" (featuring Kidd and Stinky Dink) | 5:21 |
| 7. | "Watch Out Now!" (featuring Nonchalant) | 4:27 |
| 8. | "Your Memory Lives On" | 5:29 |

== Personnel ==
- Michael "Funky Ned" Neal – bass guitar
- Milton "Go-Go Mickey" Freeman – congas, timbales, percussions
- Darrell "Blue-Eye" Arrington – drums
- John "J.B." Buchanan – flugabone
- Andre "Whiteboy" Johnson –electric guitar, vocals
- Eric "Bojack" Butcher – rototoms, timbales, percussions
- Kent Wood – keyboards
- Byron "B.J." Johnson – keyboards
- Anthony "Lil' Benny" Harley – trumpet, guest vocals
- Darren "Mr. X" Frazier – sample board, vocals
- Derek "D.P." Paige – trumpet, vocals
- Donnell Floyd – saxophone, vocals
- Charles "Shorty" Garris – vocals
- Nonchalant – guest vocals
