= Live at Celebrity Hall =

Live album by Rare Essence
- Released: 1987
- Venue: Celebrity Hall, Breeze's Metro Club
- Genre: Go-go; old-school hip hop
- Length: 36:27
- Label: Sounds of the Capital
- Producer: Rare Essence

Rare Essence chronology
Live at Breeze's Metro Club (1986)	Live at Celebrity Hall (1987)	Work the Walls (1992)

Live at Celebrity Hall (also titled as Live at the Celebrity Hall and the Metro Club) is a live album recorded and released in 1987 by the Washington, D.C.–based go-go band Rare Essence. The album was recorded live at the now defunct music venues Celebrity Hall (also referred to as "The Black Hole") and at Breeze's Metro Club, both located in Washington, D.C. This album follows their 1986 live album Live at Breeze's Metro Club and includes the singles "Still Gettin' Buzy", "Whip It", and a go-go rendition of Kool Moe Dee's song "Do You Know What Time It Is?".

== Track listing ==
Side A – Live at Celebrity Hall

1. R.E. Herman 2x – 6:54
2. Still Gettin' Buzy – 7:39
3. Whip It – 7:06

Side B – Live at the Metro Club

1. Uptown – 5:02
2. Do You Know What Time It Is? (written by Moe Dewese) – 5:13
3. Iko-Iko (written by Barbara Anne Hawkins, Rosa Lee Hawkins, Joan Marie Johnson, Sharon Jones) – 5:48

== Personnel ==
- James "Jas Funk" Thomas – lead vocals
- Quentin "Footz" Davidson – drums
- Milton "Go-Go Mickey" Freeman – congas, percussion
- Michael "Funky Ned" Neal – bass guitar
- Andre "Whiteboy" Johnson – electric guitar
- Byron "B.J." Jackson – keyboards
- John "J.B." Buchanan – keyboards, flugelhorn
- Donnell Floyd – saxophone
- David Green – timbales, backing vocals
- Derek Paige – trumpet
