= Nice & Smooth =

American rap group

- Origin: The Bronx, New York City, U.S.
- Genres: Hip hop
- Years active: 1986–present
- Labels: Fresh; Rush; Columbia; Street Life
- Members: Greg Nice; Smooth B

Nice & Smooth is an East Coast hip hop duo from New York City that consists of Gregory O. "Greg Nice" Mays (born May 30, 1967) and Darryl O. "Smooth B" Barnes (born August 3, 1965). The duo released four albums between 1989 and 1997.

Their first collaborative appearance was on the single "Dope on a Rope"/"Skill Trade" on Strange Family Records in 1987. On the strength of that underground single they managed a guest spot on the song "Pimpin Ain't Easy" by Big Daddy Kane on his 1989 album It's a Big Daddy Thing.

== Discography ==
=== Studio albums ===
List of studio albums, with selected chart positions
| Title | Album details | Peak chart positions | |
| Title | Album details | US | US R&B /HH |
|---|---|---|---|
| Nice & Smooth | Released: May 16, 1989; Label: Fresh Records; Formats: CD, LP, Cassette | — | 26 |
| Ain't a Damn Thing Changed | Released: September 3, 1991; Label: Rush/Columbia; Formats: CD, LP, Cassette | 141 | 29 |
| Jewel of the Nile | Released: June 28, 1994; Label: Rush; Formats: CD, LP, Cassette | 66 | 13 |
| IV: Blazing Hot | Released: October 28, 1997; Label: Street Life; Formats: CD, LP, Cassette | — | 75 |
"—" denotes a recording that did not chart.

=== Singles ===
==== As lead artist ====
List of singles as lead artist, with selected chart positions
| Title | Year | Peak chart positions | | | Album |
| Title | Year | US | US R&B | US Rap | Album |
|---|---|---|---|---|---|
| "Dope on a Rope" (Note: "Published as "Greg Nice & Smooth Bee".) | 1987 | — | — | x | Nice & Smooth |
| "More & More Hits" (featuring Teddy Ted) | 1989 | — | — | — | Nice & Smooth |
| "Funky for You" | 1990 | — | — | 8 | Nice & Smooth |
| "Sometimes I Rhyme Slow" | 1991 | 44 | 17 | 1 | Ain't a Damn Thing Changed |
| "Hip Hop Junkies" | 1991 | — | 38 | 5 | Ain't a Damn Thing Changed |
| "How to Flow" | 1991 | — | 23 | 5 | Strictly Business (Soundtrack) / Ain't a Damn Thing Changed |
| "Cake and Eat It Too" | 1991 | — | — | 21 | Ain't a Damn Thing Changed |
| "Old to the New" | 1994 | 59 | 43 | 6 | Jewel of the Nile |
| "Return of the Hip Hop Freaks" | 1994 | — | — | 44 | Jewel of the Nile |
| "Blazing Hot" | 1997 | — | 76 | 21 | IV: Blazing Hot |
| "Let It Go" | 1997 | — | — | — | IV: Blazing Hot |
| "Funky for You '09" (featuring Pac Div) (Note: "Funky for You '09" was released as a split single with "If I Ruled the World '09" by Nas feat. Marsha Ambrosius and "I Got Cha Opin' '09" by Buckshot feat. Kardinal Offishall.) | 2009 | — | — | — | Non-album singles |
| "2 Step" (Note: "Published as "Greg Nice & Smooth B".) | 2012 | — | — | — | Non-album singles |
| "Cake and Eat It Too (Pound Cake Mix)" (Note: "Cake and Eat It Too (Pound Cake Mix)" was released as a split single with "Brooklyn-Queens (The U.K. Power Mix)" by 3rd Bass.) | 2018 | — | — | — | Non-album singles |
"—" denotes a recording that did not chart or was not released in that territory. "x" denotes the chart did not exist at the time.

==== Featured singles ====
List of singles, with selected chart positions
| Title | Year | Peak chart positions | | | | | | | | | | | Album |
| Title | Year | US | US Dance | US R&B | US Rap | AUS | BEL | GER | NED | NZ | SWI | UK | Album |
|---|---|---|---|---|---|---|---|---|---|---|---|---|---|
| "Dwyck" (Gang Starr featuring Nice & Smooth) | 1992 | — | — | — (Note: "DWYCK" did not enter the Hot R&B/Hip-Hop Songs chart, but peaked at number seven on the Bubbling Under R&B/Hip-Hop Singles chart.) | 25 | — | — | — | — | — | — | — | Hard to Earn |
| "Do You Wanna Get Funky" (Vocal Club Mix) (C+C Music Factory featuring Martha Wash, Zelma Davis, Nice & Smooth and Trilogy) | 1994 | 40 | 1 | 11 | — | 11 | 38 | 41 | 18 | 2 | 37 | 27 | Anything Goes! |
| "WORLD MONEY" (Tomoro featuring Nice & Smooth) | 2021 | — | — | — | — | — | — | — | — | — | — | — | Non-album single |
"—" denotes a recording that did not chart or was not released in that territory.

=== Guest appearances ===
List of non-single guest appearances, with other performing artists, showing year released and album name
| Title | Year | Other performer(s) | Album |
|---|---|---|---|
| "Pimpin' Ain't Easy" | 1989 | Big Daddy Kane | It's a Big Daddy Thing |
| "Microphone Techniques" | 1991 | 3rd Bass | Derelicts of Dialect |
| "Cash in My Hands" | 1993 | —N/a | Poetic Justice (soundtrack) |
| "Dirty Dawg (Greg Nice Remix)" | 1993 | New Kids on the Block | Dirty Dawg 12" |
| "Let's All Get Down" | 1994 | Slick Rick | Behind Bars |
| "Blazing Hot (P.F Mix)" | 1997 | —N/a | #41 - Hot 2 Def |
| "1989 (Just Like Old Times)" | 2016 | —N/a | Trois souvenirs de ma jeunesse Soundtrack |
