= Strictly Business (1991 film) =

1991 film by Kevin Hooks

- Theatrical release poster
- Directed by: Kevin Hooks
- Written by: Pam Gibson; Nelson George
- Produced by: Andre Harrell; Pam Gibson
- Starring: Tommy Davidson; Joseph C. Phillips; Anne-Marie Johnson; David Marshall Grant; Halle Berry
- Cinematography: Zoltan David
- Edited by: Richard Nord
- Music by: Michel Colombier
- Production company: Island World
- Distributed by: Warner Bros.
- Release date: November 8, 1991
- Running time: 83 minutes
- Country: United States
- Language: English
- Box office: $7,683,267 (domestic)

Strictly Business is a 1991 American comedy film directed by Kevin Hooks and starring Tommy Davidson, Joseph C. Phillips, and Halle Berry. The supporting cast includes Anne-Marie Johnson, David Marshall Grant, Jon Cypher, Kim Coles, and Samuel L. Jackson. The film follows the ways of a mail clerk as he tries to hook his executive friend up with his clubbing girl pal and plays on comedy, business, romance, and ethics. It features a young Sam Rockwell, and the R&B group Jodeci right before their musical success. The film was shot at various locations in New York City. The prime location used in shooting the film was Manhattan. The film was released on November 8, 1991, and was made available for a selected audience rather than being widely released.

== Plot ==
Party boy Bobby still lives at home and is a low-level mail clerk in a big real estate investment firm. He has been there for two years but aspires to enter the trainee broker program. Bobby feels especially frustrated because a guy with less time in the mailroom gets in first.

Waymon Tinsdale is an uptight African-American in middle management at the firm on the verge of making partner. He is at lunch with a senior partner when he sees beautiful party girl Natalie, a hostess there and is instantly interested but tongue-tied.

When Waymon returns to his office he finds Bobby having fast food at his desk, hitting on a woman on his phone. They fight over the trainee program, Wayman pointing out he has less prestigious qualifications and dresses too informally.

Seeing the headshot of Natalie that Waymon has from helping her earlier, Bobby tells him he has no chance. They make a deal in which Waymon will try to move Bobby to the trainee broker program if he helps him meet her.

After an unsatisfying date night with Deidre, Waymon meets Bobby at a club. He's unsuccessful in meeting Natalie. Waymon returns to the office to continue on a report due the next day. His secretary wakes him to find out he's late to a meeting. The partner is livid that the financial report is still not complete, so he promises to have it complete for Friday.

Bobby convinces Waymon to buy some more hip clothes. They then go out to a bar where Natalie is a cocktail waitress. This time she notices him. Waymon spends the whole of Thursday on the report, which he plans to send first thing in the morning.

At a cocktail party, Waymon tells David who's also vying for partner that he completed the Savoy tower report. Deidre responds very negatively to Bobby's arrival, threatening to dump Waymon if he leaves with him. The guys head to Natalie's work, only to find out it's been closed down by the IRS. Waymon takes her off, she tells him of her dream to be a club owner and they spend the evening together.

Meanwhile, David and his trainee sneak into the office and make changes to the report. Bobby gets it to the potential Japanese investors, who pull their bid. Waymon, thinking Bobby screwed up, gets him fired. He himself is told that if he doesn't get another buyer by Monday he is also fired.

Natalie shows up in the office for her lunch date with Waymon admidst his stressful search for a new investor. He's cold and upsets her, so she tells him off and leaves. Then his secretary comes, showing him that Bobby couldn't have been to blame. Waymon seeks him out, apologizes and tells him about their need for a big investor. Bobby says to have his big presentation set for Monday and goes.

First thing Monday the Holleran brother of the Harlem National Bank arrive, and Waymon realises he'd met them out with Bobby in a club. After his presentation they sign on as the Tower's investors, and Waymon is made partner. In the lobby when they find David his trainee rats him out and he gets fired.

Waymon begs Natalie for forgiveness, and after he and Bobby take her to a huge space. The Holleran Brothers offer to invest in her club, sharing the profits 50–50

== Cast ==
- Tommy Davidson as Bobby Johnson: Bobby is a mail clerk at a major real estate firm in New York City who is care free. He is a party type who is always going out even when he has to work the next day. Despite his meek background and his club status he has some big time connections. He agrees to introduce Waymon to Natalie, as long as Waymon makes Bobby his trainee.
- Joseph C. Phillips as Waymon Tinsdale III: Waymon is a big business man who is about to be made a partner at the firm if he can close out a big deal. He is stuck in an unhappy relationship and by chance bumps into the woman of his dreams while out to lunch one day. His friend Bobby holds the key to hooking both of them up because he knows both of them and how to connect them.
- Anne-Marie Johnson as Diedre: She is the girlfriend of Waymon. She doesn't really love him but is with him because they make a good team. She is very controlling and is very materialistic.
- David Marshall Grant as David: He is a big business man and works at the firm with Waymon and Bobby. He pretends to be Waymon's friend but is actually racist and is plotting against him to fail in his latest deal.
- Halle Berry as Natalie: She is Waymon's dream girl. She is a club promoter. She also has dreams of owning her own club some day.
- Jon Cypher as Drake: He is the owner of the firm that Bobby and Waymon work at. He is the one who will promote Waymon if the deal goes through.
- Samuel L. Jackson as Monroe: He is the supervisor of the mailroom. He is a person who tries to assert his authority at all given times and also tries to suck up when the high ups are around. He is always looking for a reason to get rid of Bobby.
- Kim Coles as Millicent
- Sam Rockwell as Gary: A St. John's graduate (who is also Bobby's Friend/former co-worker) who got a promotion (to work upstairs) by David.
- Annie Golden as Sheila

== Soundtrack ==
Strictly Business

Soundtrack album by Various artists
- Released: October 29, 1991
- Recorded: 1991
- Genres: Hip hop; R&B
- Length: 46:41
- Labels: Uptown; MCA
- Producers: Dave "Jam" Hall; Marley Marl; LL Cool J; Grand Puba; DeVante Swing; Nice & Smooth; Howie Tee; Heavy D; Leaders of the New School; Hurby Luv Bug; Epic Mazur; Richard Wolf

A soundtrack album was released on October 29, 1991, through Uptown Records and consisted of hip hop and R&B music. The soundtrack reached number 64 on the Top R&B Albums chart, and its lone single, "Strictly Business" by LL Cool J, did not chart.

=== Track listing ===
| No. | Title | Performer(s) | Length |
|---|---|---|---|
| 1. | "I Just Want Love" | Stephanie Mills | 4:04 |
| 2. | "You Called and Told Me" | Jeff Redd | 5:25 |
| 3. | "Strictly Business" | LL Cool J | 4:14 |
| 4. | "You Remind Me" | Mary J. Blige | 5:09 |
| 5. | "Fat Rat" | Grand Puba | 4:09 |
| 6. | "Let's Fly" | Jodeci | 3:39 |
| 7. | "How to Flow" | Nice & Smooth | 4:26 |
| 8. | "Let the People Sing" | Heavy D & the Boyz | 3:44 |
| 9. | "Shining Star" | Leaders of the New School | 3:45 |
| 10. | "Lock It" | Rare Essence | 3:55 |
| 11. | "Now's the B Turn" | Laquan | 4:50 |
| Total length: | | | 46:41 |

== Reception ==
=== Box office ===
On its first weekend the film made $2.4 million and ended earning $7.7 million.

=== Critical response ===
On the review aggregator website Rotten Tomatoes, 10% of 10 critics' reviews are positive.
