= Live at Breeze's Metro Club =

Live album by Rare Essence
- Released: 1986
- Recorded: 1986
- Venue: Breeze's Metro Club; Washington, D.C.
- Genre: Go-go; old-school hip hop
- Length: 38:46
- Label: Kolossal Records
- Producer: Rare Essence, Jas Funk

Rare Essence chronology
Live at Breeze's Metro Club (1986)	Live at Celebrity Hall (1987)

Live at Breeze's Metro Club is a live album recorded and released in 1986 by the Washington, D.C.–based go-go band Rare Essence. The album was recorded at the now defunct Breeze's Metro Club, a music venue formerly located on Bladensburg Road in the Gateway neighborhood of Northeast, Washington, D.C. The album is also referred to as The Album That Kept the Whole Neighborhood Rockin'.

The album includes the local hits in the D.C. music scene "Roll Call", "Shake It (But Don't Break It)", "One On One", and the nationwide hit "Do the Mickey", which is a remake of The Miracles 1963 song "Mickey's Monkey". The song "Do the Mickey" is a homage to Rare Essence's conga player Milton "Go-Go Mickey" Freeman.

== Track listing ==
No.	Title	Length
1.	"Roll Call"	10:36
2.	"One On One"	7:43
3.	"I Must Be Dreamin'"	6:10
4.	"The Medley"; A: "Friends Don't Let Friends Drive Drunk"; B: "R.E. Get Busy One Time"	0:31; 1:56
5.	"Shake It (But Don't Break It)"	5:53
6.	"Do the Mickey"	6:00
Total length:		38:46

== Personnel ==
- James "Jas Funk" Thomas – lead vocals
- Quentin "Footz" Davidson – drums
- Milton "Go-Go Mickey" Freeman – congas, percussion
- Michael "Funky Ned" Neal – bass guitar
- Andre "Whiteboy" Johnson – electric guitar
- Byron "B.J." Jackson – keyboards
- John "J.B." Buchanan – keyboards, flugelhorn
- Donnell Griffin Floyd – saxophone
- David Green – timbales, backing vocals
- Derek Paige – trumpet
- Mike Neal – recording engineers, mixing
- Bill Mueller – engineer
