= List of models in music videos =

This is a list of models who have appeared in music videos of different singers and musical groups.

== Overview ==
Pre-empting the genre, the 1966 experimental multimedia 18-minute short film Andy Warhol's Exploding Plastic Inevitable features performances by The Velvet Underground and Nico, with Edie Sedgwick.

Models have appeared in music videos since no later than the 1970s; preceding the beginning of the MTV era, in 1981. Pre-MTV examples include Cyrinda Foxe's performance in David Bowie's "The Jean Genie" music video, in 1972, and Jerry Hall's performance in the music video for Bryan Ferry's cover version of "Let's Stick Together", in 1976.

Frequently, models already have well-established names and faces, with significant public awareness, before appearing in music videos. These include Sports Illustrated cover model Christie Brinkley appearing in Billy Joel's "Uptown Girl" video, the early 1990s supermodels appearing in George Michael's "Freedom! '90" video, and the various Victoria's Secret models who went on to appear in music videos.

In a few instances, individual models have appeared repeatedly in the music videos of one musical performer. Such a model sometimes becomes a signature collaborator with, or muse of, that one performer. Examples include Christie Brinkley's work with her partner and later husband Billy Joel, Lysette Anthony's work with Bryan Adams during his Reckless era, Tawny Kitaen's work with Whitesnake in the late 1980s, Linda Evangelista's couple of videos with George Michael in the early 1990s, Stephanie Seymour's videos with Guns N' Roses during their Use Your Illusion I and Use Your Illusion II era, and Behati Prinsloo's work with her partner and later husband Adam Levine in various Maroon 5 videos. Vice versa, model ensembles have appeared in the music videos of George Michael's "Freedom! '90" and "Too Funky", Duran Duran's "Girl Panic!" and Fergie's "M.I.L.F. $".

Some models have gone on to perform in their own music videos, or to feature as singers in other performers' music videos. These include Caprice Bourret, Cara Delevingne and her sister Poppy, Carla Bruni, Daniela Lalita, Grace Jones, Karen Elson, Lisa Barbuscia, Miranda Kerr, Naomi Campbell, Sabrina Salerno, Sade and Samantha Fox, among others.

In rarer cases, models directed their own music videos (Charlotte Kemp Muhl and Daniela Lalita) or those of other artists (Cara Delevingne, Agyness Deyn, Ellen von Unwerth and Rie Rasmussen).

Models have also appeared in musical scenes, which contain complete songs, within feature films. An example is the opening credits of The Secret of My Success, in which Cindy Crawford and Tatjana Patitz make appearances walking to the title song by Night Ranger. A further example is the opening credits of Cool as Ice, which features Naomi Campbell and Bobbie Brown performing for the film's title song alongside Vanilla Ice. In both instances, separate music videos were also produced for the songs. The Night Ranger video for "The Secret of My Success" featured the band and other musicians only. In contrast, Vanilla Ice's "Cool As Ice (Everybody Get Loose)" video featured scenes from the film, which included the models.

The processes of runway and studio modelling have featured, among others, in the music videos of Kraftwerk's "The Model", George Michael's "Father Figure" and "Too Funky", Right Said Fred's "I'm Too Sexy" and Simple Minds' "Real Life" song from the album of the same name.

In at least one instance in a music video, a musical performer has directly emulated the earlier work of a model: One scene in Madonna's "Vogue" music video, from 1990, was an homage to a pose by Madame Bernon; from Horst P. Horst's "Mainbocher Corset" photograph of 1939. Madonna's "Justify My Love" music video was also influenced strongly by the provocative models in the black and white photography of Robert Mapplethorpe and Helmut Newton.

== Table of models and videos ==
If available, the relevant official music video is linked from the table. Dancers, actors and other non-musician performances are not usually included in this list, unless they were recognised as professional models around the time of each music video's creation. Likewise, musicians who have gone on to model, as a secondary career, are not included in the lefthand column.

| Model | Year | Music video | | | Refs. & notes |
| Model | Year | Song | Performer | Link | Refs. & notes |
|---|---|---|---|---|---|
| Aaron Philip | 2019 | "Mother's Daughter" | Miley Cyrus | YouTube | |
| Achok Majak | 2018 | "Shame" | Maxwell | YouTube | |
| Achok Majak | 2018 | "No Stylist" | French Montana ft. Drake | YouTube | |
| Adesuwa Aighewi | 2011 | "Bonfire" | Childish Gambino | YouTube | |
| Adesuwa Aighewi | 2011 | "Heartbeat" | Childish Gambino | YouTube | |
| Adesuwa Aighewi | 2016 | "Woman" | Diana Gordon | YouTube | |
| Adonis Bosso | 2018 | "Shame" | Maxwell | YouTube | |
| Ariadna Gutiérrez | 2025 | "BRONCEADOR" | Maluma | YouTube | |
| Adriana Lima | 2002 | "Yesterday Is Gone (My Dear Kay)" | Lenny Kravitz | YouTube | |
| Adut Akech | 2019 | "Brown Skin Girl" (Black is King video) | Beyoncé ft. Saint Jhn & Wizkid | YouTube | |
| Adwoa Aboah | 2017 | "(No One Knows Me) Like the Piano" | Sampha | YouTube | |
| Adwoa Aboah | 2011 | "Carbonated" | Mount Kimbie | YouTube | |
| Agyness Deyn | 2011 | "Iron" | Woodkid | YouTube | |
| Aiden Curtiss | 2018 | "No Stylist" | French Montana ft. Drake | YouTube | |
| Alana Champion | 2021 | "Pawn Shop Blues" | Lana Del Rey | | |
| Alana Champion | 2021 | "Blue Banisters" | Lana Del Rey | | |
| Alek Wek | 1995 | "GoldenEye" | Tina Turner | YouTube | |
| Alek Wek | 1997 | "Got 'til It's Gone" | Janet Jackson ft. Q-Tip and Joni Mitchell | YouTube | |
| Alek Wek | 1997 | "Put Your Hands Where My Eyes Could See" | Busta Rhymes | YouTube | |
| Alek Wek | 1999 | "Every You Every Me" | Placebo | YouTube | |
| Alessandra Ambrosio | 2016 | "M.I.L.F. $" | Fergie | YouTube | |
| Alessandra Ambrosio | 2016 | "Wolves" | Kanye West | YouTube | |
| Alex Dunstan | 2018 | "I Want Your Love" | Lady Gaga | YouTube | |
| Alex Lundqvist | 2007 | "Clumsy" | Fergie | YouTube | |
| Alexa Chung | 2002 | "Down Boy" | Holly Valance | YouTube | |
| Alexa Chung | 2003 | "Lost Without You" | Delta Goodrem | YouTube | |
| Alexa Chung | 2003 | "Hey Whatever" | Westlife | YouTube | |
| Alexa Chung | 2008 | "My Mistakes Were Made for You" | The Last Shadow Puppets | YouTube | |
| Alexa Chung | 2017 | "Dance With Me" | Cam Avery | YouTube | |
| Alexandra Crandell | 2007 | "Falling Down" | Duran Duran | YouTube | |
| Alexandra Crandell | 2005 | "No Promises" | Shayne Ward | YouTube | |
| Alexandra Elizabeth Ljadov | 2019 | "Don't Start Now" | Dua Lipa | YouTube | |
| Alexis Ren | 2015 | "Silverlined" | XYconstant | YouTube | |
| Alexis Ren | 2016 | "Hey" | Fais ft. Afrojack | YouTube | |
| Alexis Ren | 2016 | "Is It Love" | 3lau | YouTube | |
| Alexis Ren | 2017 | "Paris" (lyric video) | The Chainsmokers | YouTube | |
| Alexis Ren | 2019 | "South of the Border" | Ed Sheeran ft. Camila Cabello & Cardi B | YouTube | |
| Ali Michael | 2016 | "On Hold" | The xx | YouTube | |
| Aliz Menyhert | 2017 | "Heaven" | Dimitri | YouTube | |
| Alla Kostromichova | 2010 | "Monster" | Kanye West ft. Jay-Z, Rick Ross, Nicki Minaj & Bon Iver | | |
| Alyssa Sutherland | 2004 | "Where Are We Runnin'?" | Lenny Kravitz | YouTube | |
| Amanda Cazalet | 1990 | "Justify My Love" | Madonna | YouTube | |
| Amanda Fields | 2009 | "Your Decision" | Alice in Chains | YouTube | |
| Amber Rose | 2008 | "Put On" | Young Jeezy ft. Kanye West | YouTube | |
| Amber Valletta | 2008 | "Yes We Can" | Will.i.am | YouTube | |
| Amber Valletta | 2016 | "M.I.L.F. $" | Fergie | YouTube | |
| Ana Cristina Oliveira | 1996 | "The Only Thing That Looks Good On Me Is You" | Bryan Adams | YouTube | |
| Ana Cristina Oliveira | 1999 | "Can't Change Me" | Chris Cornell | YouTube | |
| Anais Mali | 2016 | "Mania" | The Weeknd | YouTube | |
| Anastasia Krivosheeva | 2013 | "Up in the Air" | 30 Seconds To Mars | YouTube | |
| Andreja Pejić | 2013 | "The Stars (Are Out Tonight)" | David Bowie | YouTube | |
| Andrey Kupchenko | 2018 | "Back to You" | Selena Gomez | YouTube | |
| Andrés Velencoso | 2000 | "El Cielo No Entiende" | OBK | YouTube | |
| Angela Lindvall | 2016 | "M.I.L.F. $" | Fergie | YouTube | |
| Ángela Ponce | 2022 | "A Veces Bien Y A Veces Mal" | Ricky Martin | YouTube | |
| Anja Rubik | 2014 | "Chleb" | Mister D | YouTube | |
| Anja Rubik | 2016 | "Lost Me" | Mary Komasa | YouTube | |
| Anna Cleveland | 2016 | "Wolves" | Kanye West | YouTube | |
| Anna Maria Jagodzinska | 2019 | "The Last Time" | The Script | YouTube | |
| Anna Nicole Smith | 2004 | "The New Workout Plan" | Kanye West | YouTube | |
| Anne Vyalitsyna | 2004 | "Out Is Through" (Version 2) | Alanis Morissette | | |
| Anne Vyalitsyna | 2010 | "Misery" | Maroon 5 | YouTube | |
| Anne Vyalitsyna | 2011 | "Never Gonna Leave This Bed" | Maroon 5 | YouTube | |
| Andi Muise | 2011 | "Empire State of Mind (Life + Times Version)" | Jay-Z ft. Alicia Keys | YouTube | |
| Anok Yai | 2024 | "I Know ?" | Travis Scott | YouTube | |
| Antonio Sabàto Jr. | 1990 | "Love Will Never Do (Without You)" | Janet Jackson | YouTube | |
| Arizona Muse | 2016 | "Places" | Martin Solveig ft. Ina Wroldsen | YouTube | |
| Arthur Kulkov | 2016 | "Полчеловека" (Half-man) | Rita Dakota | YouTube | |
| Ashley Graham | 2016 | "Toothbrush" | DNCE | YouTube | |
| Ashley Graham | 2018 | "Girls Like You" (Original version) | Maroon 5 ft. Cardi B | YouTube | |
| Ashley Graham | 2018 | "Girls Like You" (Volume 2 version) | Maroon 5 ft. Cardi B | YouTube | |
| Ashley Graham | 2018 | "Girls Like You" (Vertical Video version) | Maroon 5 ft. Cardi B | | |
| Ashley Graham | 2023 | "Cut" | Tori Kelly | | |
| Ashley Sky | 2011 | "Otis" | Watch the Throne (Jay-Z and Kanye West) | YouTube | |
| Ashton Phillips | 2011 | "Empire State of Mind (Life + Times Version)" | Jay-Z ft. Alicia Keys | YouTube | |
| Ataui Deng | 2011 | "Empire State of Mind (Life + Times Version)" | Jay-Z ft. Alicia Keys | YouTube | |
| Audrey Marnay | 2002 | "How Does It Make You Feel?" | Air | YouTube | |
| Aurélie Claudel | 2000 | "Private Emotion" | Ricky Martin | YouTube | |
| Ava Fabian | 1988 | "Way Cool Jr." | Ratt | YouTube | |
| Aweng Chuol | 2019 | "Brown Skin Girl" (Black is King video) | Beyoncé ft. Saint Jhn & Wizkid | YouTube | |
| Aymeline Valade | 2018 | "I Want Your Love" | Lady Gaga | YouTube | |
| Bar Refaeli | 2018 | "Nesicha Sheli" | Ivri Lider | YouTube | |
| Barbara Palvin | 2018 | "On The Line" | Julian Perretta | YouTube | |
| Barbara Palvin | 2022 | "Miss America" | Bazzi | YouTube | |
| Barbara Stoyanoff | 2012 | "Song for All the Girls" | Cisco Adler featuring Young Chris | YouTube | |
| Behati Prinsloo | 2009 | "Rich Girls" | The Virgins | YouTube | |
| Behati Prinsloo | 2014 | "Animals" | Maroon 5 | YouTube | |
| Behati Prinsloo | 2015 | "Hands to Myself" (Victoria's Secret video) | Selena Gomez | | |
| Behati Prinsloo | 2016 | "Body Moves" (Victoria's Secret video) | DNCE | | |
| Behati Prinsloo | 2017 | "Cold" | Maroon 5 ft. Future | YouTube | |
| Behati Prinsloo | 2018 | "Wait" (Snapchat version) | Maroon 5 | | |
| Behati Prinsloo | 2018 | "Girls Like You" (Original version) | Maroon 5 ft. Cardi B | YouTube | |
| Behati Prinsloo | 2018 | "Girls Like You" (Volume 2 version) | Maroon 5 ft. Cardi B | YouTube | |
| Behati Prinsloo | 2018 | "Girls Like You" (Vertical Video version) | Maroon 5 ft. Cardi B | | |
| Behati Prinsloo | 2021 | "Lost" | Maroon 5 | YouTube | |
| Behati Prinsloo | 2023 | "Middle Ground" | Maroon 5 | YouTube | |
| Behati Prinsloo | 2025 | "All Night" | Maroon 5 | YouTube | |
| Bella Hadid | 2015 | "In the Night" | The Weeknd | YouTube | |
| Bella Hadid | 2022 | "Code" | Offset ft. Moneybagg Yo | YouTube | |
| Bernice Burgos | 2011 | "Work Out" | J. Cole | YouTube | |
| Bernice Burgos | 2012 | "Diced Pineapples" | Rick Ross ft. Drake and Wale | YouTube | |
| Bernice Burgos | 2016 | "Do You Mind" | DJ Khaled ft. Nicki Minaj, Chris Brown, Jeremih, Future, August Alsina and Rick Ross | YouTube | |
| Bernice Burgos | 2019 | "Stubborn Ass" | Young M.A | YouTube | |
| Bernice Burgos | 2020 | "Body" | Megan Thee Stallion | YouTube | |
| Beverly Peele | 1992 | "Too Funky" | George Michael | YouTube | |
| Beverly Peele | 1995 | "Freek'n You" | Jodeci | YouTube | |
| Blac Chyna | 2010 | "Monster" | Kanye West, Jay-Z, Rick Ross, Nicki Minaj and Bon Iver | | |
| Blac Chyna | 2011 | "Rack City" | Tyga | YouTube | |
| Blac Chyna | 2012 | "Come on a Cone" | Nicki Minaj | | |
| Blac Chyna | 2017 | "Rake It Up" | Yo Gotti ft. Nicki Minaj | YouTube | |
| Blac Chyna | 2020 | "Body" | Megan Thee Stallion | YouTube | |
| Blac Chyna | 2020 | "TUTU" | 6ix9ine | YouTube | |
| Bobbie Brown | 1988 | "I'm on to You" | Hurricane | | |
| Bobbie Brown | 1989 | "Once Bitten, Twice Shy" | Great White | YouTube | |
| Bobbie Brown | 1989 | "House of Broken Love" | Great White | | |
| Bobbie Brown | 1990 | "Cherry Pie" | Warrant | YouTube | |
| Bobbie Brown | 1990 | "Sittin' in the Lap of Luxury" | Louie Louie | YouTube | |
| Bobbie Brown | 1991 | "Cool as Ice (Everybody Get Loose)" | Vanilla Ice | | (Note: Bobbie Brown is credited as Bobby Brown in the Cool as Ice film. Part of her scene appears in the accompanying music video.) |
| Bobbie Brown | 2016 | "She's Tight" | Steel Panther | YouTube | |
| Brad Alphonso | 2012 | "Girl Gone Wild" | Madonna | YouTube | |
| Bradley Soileau | 2011 | "Born To Die" | Lana Del Rey | YouTube | |
| Bradley Soileau | 2012 | "Blue Jeans" | Lana Del Rey | YouTube | |
| Bradley Soileau | 2014 | "West Coast" | Lana Del Rey | YouTube | |
| Breana McDow | 2011 | "Stereo Hearts" (Lyric video) | Gym Class Heroes ft. Adam Levine | | |
| Breana McDow | 2011 | "Suck It and See" | Arctic Monkeys | YouTube | |
| Breana McDow | 2011 | "Evil Twin" | Arctic Monkeys | YouTube | |
| Breana McDow | 2012 | "Black Treacle" | Arctic Monkeys | YouTube | |
| Bregje Heinen | 2012 | "Payphone" | Maroon 5 ft. Wiz Khalifa | YouTube | |
| Brenda Gonzalez | 2003 | "Let's Get Down" | Bow Wow | YouTube | |
| Brenda Gonzalez | 2004 | "My Cinderella" | Lil Romeo | | |
| Brenda Gonzalez | 2004 | "Drop It Like It's Hot" | Snoop Dogg | YouTube | |
| Brenda Gonzalez | 2005 | "Caught Up" | Usher | YouTube | |
| Brenda Gonzalez | 2005 | "Fireman" | Lil Wayne | YouTube | |
| Brenda Gonzalez | 2006 | "Snap Yo Fingers" | Lil Jon ft. Sean Paul & E-40 | YouTube | |
| Brenda Gonzalez | 2008 | "Dangerous" | Kardinal Offishal ft. Akon | YouTube | |
| Brenda Gonzalez | 2009 | "Replay" | Iyaz | YouTube | |
| Brenda Gonzalez | 2011 | "How To Love" | Lil Wayne | YouTube | |
| Brenda Gonzalez | 2012 | "Gangnam Style" | PSY | YouTube | |
| Brenda Gonzalez | 2012 | "As Long As You Love Me" | Justin Bieber | YouTube | |
| Brenda Gonzalez | 2017 | "Despacito" | Luis Fonsi ft. Daddy Yankee | YouTube | |
| Brenda Mutoni | 2011 | "Empire State of Mind (Life + Times Version)" | Jay-Z ft. Alicia Keys | YouTube | |
| Bryan McMullin | 2007 | "Girlfriend" | Avril Lavigne | YouTube | |
| Bunty Bailey | 1985 | "Take On Me" | A-Ha | YouTube | |
| Cailin Russo | 2013 | "All That Matters" | Justin Bieber | YouTube | |
| Cailin Russo | 2013 | "Confident" | Justin Bieber | YouTube | |
| Camila Alves | 2002 | "Misunderstood" | Bon Jovi | YouTube | |
| Camila Alves | 2006 | "Pullin' Me Back" | Chingy | YouTube | |
| Camila Alves | 2007 | "Because of You" | Ne-Yo | YouTube | |
| Camille Rowe | 2011 | "Call Me Back" | The Strokes | YouTube | |
| Camille Rowe | 2013 | "Alien Days" | MGMT | YouTube | |
| Camille Rowe | 2015 | "Weight of Love" | The Black Keys | | |
| Candice Swanepoel | 2015 | "Hands to Myself" (Victoria's Secret video) | Selena Gomez | | |
| Caprice Bourret | 1999 | "Oh Yeah" | Herself | | |
| Caprice Bourret | 2001 | "Once Around the Sun" | Herself | | |
| Cara Delevingne | 2010 | "You Can Dance" | Bryan Ferry | YouTube | |
| Cara Delevingne | 2010 | "Shameless" | Bryan Ferry | YouTube | |
| Cara Delevingne | 2013 | "Facemelt" (Hunger TV version) | Rita Ora | | |
| Cara Delevingne | 2014 | "Ugly Boy" | Die Antwoord | YouTube | |
| Cara Delevingne | 2015 | "Nothing Came To Me" | Donnie Trumpet & The Social Experiment | YouTube | |
| Cara Delevingne | 2015 | "Dope Walk" | ASAP Ferg | YouTube | |
| Cara Delevingne | 2015 | "Bad Blood" | Taylor Swift ft. Kendrick Lamar | YouTube | |
| Cara Delevingne | 2017 | "I Feel Everything" | Herself | YouTube | |
| Cara Delevingne | 2018 | "River Water" | The Spencer Lee Band | YouTube | |
| Cara Delevingne | 2019 | "Rudeboy Lovesong" | Shy FX featuring Herself and Sweetie Irie | YouTube | |
| Cara Delevingne | 2019 | "Nightmare" | Halsey | YouTube | |
| Cara Delevingne | 2019 | "Can't Wait" | The Akergirls | YouTube | |
| Cara Delevingne | 2020 | "Imagine" | Gal Gadot & Friends | | |
| Cara Delevingne | 2024 | "Step into Christmas" | Elton John | YouTube | |
| Carla Bruni | 2002 | "Quelqu'un m'a dit" | Herself | YouTube | |
| Carla Bruni | 2002 | "Tout le monde" | Herself | YouTube | |
| Carla Bruni | 2013 | "Chez Keith et Anita" | Herself | YouTube | |
| Carla Bruni | 2013 | "Mon Raymond" | Herself | YouTube | |
| Carla Bruni | 2013 | "J'arrive à toi" | Herself | YouTube | |
| Carla Bruni | 2017 | "Enjoy the Silence" | Herself | YouTube | |
| Carla Bruni | 2017 | "Miss You" | Herself | YouTube | |
| Carla Bruni | 2021 | "Quelque chose" | Herself | YouTube | |
| Carmen Solomons | 2014 | "Good Kisser" | Usher | YouTube | |
| Carmen Solomons | 2018 | "Money" | Cardi B | YouTube | |
| Caroline Cossey | 1985 | "Some Like It Hot" | The Power Station | YouTube | |
| Caroline Cossey | 1985 | "Get It On (Bang A Gong)" | The Power Station | YouTube | |
| Caroline Munro | 1982 | "Goody Two Shoes" | Adam Ant | YouTube | |
| Caroline Munro | 1983 | "If You Really Want To" | Meat Loaf | YouTube | |
| Carolyn Murphy | 2002 | "Are You In?" | Incubus | YouTube | |
| Casil McArthur | 2019 | "Mother's Daughter" | Miley Cyrus | YouTube | |
| Ceval | 2026 | "SS26" | Charli XCX | YouTube | |
| Chanel Iman | 2012 | "Dive" | Usher | YouTube | |
| Chanel Iman | 2014 | "Yoncé" | Beyoncé | YouTube | |
| Chanel Iman | 2015 | "Can't Feel My Face" | The Weeknd | YouTube | |
| Charlotte Free | 2012 | "Look Around" | Red Hot Chili Peppers | YouTube | |
| Charlotte Free | 2014 | "Ugly Boy" | Die Antwoord | YouTube | |
| Charlotte Kemp Muhl | 2002 | "Imbranato" | Tiziano Ferro | YouTube | |
| Charlotte Kemp Muhl | 2003 | "Purple" | Whirlwind Heat | YouTube | |
| Charlotte Kemp Muhl | 2005 | "Just Feel Better" | Santana featuring Steven Tyler | YouTube | |
| Charlotte Kemp Muhl | 2006 | "Lolita" | Elefant | YouTube | |
| Charlotte Kemp Muhl | 2007 | "Find a New Way (Terry Richardson Version)" | Young Love | YouTube | |
| Charlotte Kemp Muhl | 2013 | "Borne Away" | Jesse Harris | YouTube | |
| Charlotte Kemp Muhl | 2014 | "Aztec Corn" | David Strange | YouTube | |
| Charlotte Kemp Muhl | 2014 | "Vitamin Pills" | David Strange | YouTube | |
| Charlotte Kemp Muhl | 2020 | "Debris" | UNI and The Urchins | YouTube | |
| Charlotte Kemp Muhl | 2021 | "Donna Marijuana" | UNI and The Urchins | YouTube | |
| Charlotte McKinney | 2015 | "Punching Bag" | Akillezz | YouTube | |
| Charlotte McKinney | 2015 | "Can It Be You?" | North of Mine | | |
| Charlotte McKinney | 2015 | "Might Not" | Belly ft. The Weeknd | YouTube | |
| Charlotte McKinney | 2016 | "I'm Not The One" | Pete Yorn | YouTube | |
| Charlotte McKinney | 2016 | "Body Moves" | DNCE | YouTube | |
| Chantal Stafford-Abbott | 2011 | "Empire State of Mind (Life + Times Version)" | Jay-Z ft. Alicia Keys | YouTube | |
| Chrissy Teigen | 2007 | "Stereo" | John Legend | YouTube | |
| Chrissy Teigen | 2014 | "You & I (Nobody in the World)" | John Legend | YouTube | |
| Chrissy Teigen | 2013 | "All of Me" | John Legend | YouTube | |
| Chrissy Teigen | 2016 | "M.I.L.F. $" | Fergie | YouTube | |
| Chrissy Teigen | 2016 | "Love Me Now" | John Legend | YouTube | |
| Christie Brinkley | 1983 | "Uptown Girl" | Billy Joel | YouTube | |
| Christie Brinkley | 1985 | "Keeping the Faith" | Billy Joel | YouTube | |
| Christie Brinkley | 1986 | "A Matter of Trust" | Billy Joel | YouTube | |
| Christie Brinkley | 1993 | "The River of Dreams" | Billy Joel | YouTube | |
| Christy Turlington | 1986 | "Notorious" | Duran Duran | YouTube | |
| Christy Turlington | 1990 | "Freedom! '90" | George Michael | YouTube | |
| Christy Turlington | 2002 | "With My Own Two Hands" | Ben Harper | YouTube | |
| Cindy Crawford | 1990 | "Freedom! '90" | George Michael | YouTube | |
| Cindy Crawford | 1994 | "Please Come Home For Christmas" | Jon Bon Jovi | YouTube | |
| Cindy Crawford | 2011 | "Girl Panic!" | Duran Duran | YouTube | |
| Cindy Crawford | 2015 | "Bad Blood" | Taylor Swift ft. Kendrick Lamar | YouTube | |
| Cindy Crawford | 2016 | "Wolves" | Kanye West | YouTube | |
| Claudia Schiffer | 2000 | "Say It Isn't So" | Bon Jovi | YouTube | |
| Claudia Schiffer | 2001 | "Uptown Girl" | Westlife | YouTube | |
| Connie Fleming | 1992 | "Too Funky" | George Michael | YouTube | |
| Constance Jablonski | 2011 | "Empire State of Mind (Life + Times Version)" | Jay-Z ft. Alicia Keys | YouTube | |
| Cynthia Bailey | 1989 | "Round & Round" | New Order | YouTube | |
| Cyrinda Foxe | 1972 | "The Jean Genie" | David Bowie | YouTube | |
| Daisy Lowe | 2014 | "Leave Your Lover" | Sam Smith | YouTube | |
| Daiane Sodre | 2018 | "No Stylist" | French Montana ft. Drake | YouTube | |
| Damaris Lewis | 2010 | "Monster" | Kanye West ft. Jay-Z, Rick Ross, Nicki Minaj & Bon Iver | | |
| Daniela Braga | 2016 | "The Wonderful Ones" | Ryan Leslie | YouTube | |
| Daniela Lalita | 2019 | "AS Acá" | Amnesia Scanner | YouTube | |
| Daniela Lalita | 2022 | "Tenía Razón" | Herself | YouTube | |
| Daniela Lalita | 2022 | "No Para" | Herself | YouTube | |
| Daniela Lalita | 2022 | "Pisoteo" | Herself | YouTube | |
| Daniela Lalita | 2022 | "Atrás" | Herself | YouTube | |
| Daniela Lalita | 2023 | "Trececerotres" | Herself | YouTube | |
| Daniela Lalita | 2023 | "Drugs" | Mura Masa | YouTube | |
| Daniela Lalita | 2024 | "Trenzas" | Meth Math | YouTube | |
| Daniela Lalita | 2024 | "Pinky Ring" | Tristán! | YouTube | |
| Daniela Lalita | 2026 | "Tiroteo" | Herself | YouTube | |
| Danièle Arnaud | 1983 | "Sharp Dressed Man" | ZZ Top | YouTube | |
| Danièle Arnaud | 1983 | "Gimme All Your Lovin'" | ZZ Top | YouTube | |
| Danièle Arnaud | 1984 | "Legs" | ZZ Top | YouTube | |
| Daphne Groeneveld | 2011 | "Empire State of Mind (Life + Times Version)" | Jay-Z ft. Alicia Keys | YouTube | |
| David Agbodji | 2018 | "I Want Your Love" | Lady Gaga | YouTube | |
| David Gandy | 2014 | "First Love" | Jennifer Lopez | YouTube | |
| Deborah Leng | 1987 | "Cowboys and Indians" | The Cross | YouTube | |
| Deborah Leng | 1989 | "Breakthru" | Queen | YouTube | |
| Debra Shaw | 1996 | "Fastlove" | George Michael | YouTube | |
| Debra Shaw | 2026 | "SS26" | Charli XCX | YouTube | |
| Denice D. Lewis | 1986 | "The Flame" | Arcadia | YouTube | |
| Denice D. Lewis | 1988 | "Kiss and Tell" | Bryan Ferry | YouTube | |
| Denice D. Lewis | 1991 | "Senza una donna" | Zucchero and Paul Young | YouTube | |
| Denice D. Lewis | 1992 | "I'm Too Sexy" | Right Said Fred | YouTube | |
| Devon Aoki | 1997 | "Electric Barbarella" | Duran Duran | YouTube | |
| Devon Aoki | 1997 | "Kowalski" | Primal Scream | YouTube | |
| Devon Aoki | 2003 | "Act a Fool" | Ludacris | YouTube | |
| Devon Aoki | 2006 | "Bones" | The Killers | YouTube | |
| Devon Aoki | 2013 | "Just Another Girl" | The Killers | YouTube | |
| Devon Aoki | 2016 | "M.I.L.F. $" | Fergie | YouTube | |
| Devon Aoki | 2018 | "Waste It on Me" | Steve Aoki ft. BTS | YouTube | |
| Diandra Forrest | 2010 | "POWER" | Kanye West | YouTube | |
| Diandra Forrest | 2013 | "XO" | Beyoncé | YouTube | |
| Diandra Forrest | 2014 | "Pretty Hurts" | Beyoncé | YouTube | |
| Diane Manzo | 1987 | "Shattered Dreams" | Johnny Hates Jazz | YouTube | |
| Diane Manzo | 1988 | "Pamela" | Toto | YouTube | |
| Diane Manzo | 1991 | "Poundcake" | Van Halen | YouTube | |
| Dilone | 2016 | "Wolves" | Kanye West | YouTube | |
| Donna Rupert | 1984 | "Hot for Teacher" | Van Halen | YouTube | |
| Duckie Thot | 2017 | "Saved" | Khalid | YouTube | |
| Dylan Penn | 2014 | "Chains" | Nick Jonas | YouTube | |
| Edie Sedgwick | 1985 | "Anything, Anything (I'll Give You)" | Dramarama | | (Note: Edie Sedgwick's performance is pre-existing footage from the 1972 film Ciao! Manhattan.) |
| Edita Vilkeviciute | 2011 | "Empire State of Mind (Life + Times Version)" | Jay-Z ft. Alicia Keys | YouTube | |
| Elaine Irwin | 1989 | "Round & Round" | New Order | YouTube | |
| Elaine Irwin | 1991 | "Get a Leg Up" | John Mellencamp | YouTube | |
| Elina Hsiung | 2017 | "El Farsante (Remix)" | Ozuna ft. Romeo Santos | YouTube | |
| Elina Hsiung | 2019 | "Runaway" | Sebastián Yatra ft. Daddy Yankee and Natti Natasha | YouTube | |
| Elizabeth and Victoria Lejonhjärta | 2016 | "Please Forgive Me" | Drake | | |
| Elizabeth and Victoria Lejonhjärta | 2018 | "Nice for What" | Drake | YouTube | |
| Ella Halikas | 2023 | "Basic Bro" | Robbie Tripp | YouTube | |
| Elle Evans | 2013 | "Blurred Lines" | Robin Thicke | YouTube | |
| Elsa Hosk | 2005 | "Who's That Girl" | Darin | YouTube | |
| Elsa Hosk | 2015 | "Hands to Myself" (Victoria's Secret video) | Selena Gomez | | |
| Elsa Hosk | 2016 | "Body Moves" (Victoria's Secret video) | DNCE | | |
| Elsa Hosk | 2017 | "2U" (Victoria's Secret video) | David Guetta ft. Justin Bieber | YouTube | |
| Elsa Benitez | 2002 | "Love to See You Cry" | Enrique Iglesias | YouTube | |
| Emma Sjöberg | 1992 | "Too Funky" | George Michael | YouTube | |
| Emily Ratajkowski | 2012 | "Fast Car" | Taio Cruz | | |
| Emily Ratajkowski | 2013 | "Blurred Lines" | Robin Thicke ft. T.I. and Pharrell Williams | YouTube | |
| Emily Ratajkowski | 2013 | "Love Somebody" | Maroon 5 | YouTube | |
| Emily Ratajkowski | 2016 | "Inseparable" | Dima Bilan | | |
| Emily Ratajkowski | 2024 | "I Know ?" | Travis Scott | YouTube | |
| Erica Andrews | 2007 | "Won't Go Home Without You" | Maroon 5 | YouTube | |
| Erica Andrews | 2011 | "Don't Make Me Take It" | Deborah Vial | YouTube | |
| Erin Wasson | 2012 | "Madness" | Muse | | |
| Estelle Lefébure | 1992 | "Too Funky" | George Michael | YouTube | |
| Eugenia Volodina | 2003 | "Change Clothes" | Jay-Z ft. Pharrell | YouTube | |
| Eva Herzigová | 1992 | "Too Funky" | George Michael | YouTube | |
| Eva Herzigová | 2011 | "Girl Panic!" | Duran Duran | YouTube | |
| Eva De Dominici | 2019 | "Centavito" | Romeo Santos | YouTube | |
| Fabiana Mayer | 2011 | "Empire State of Mind (Life + Times Version)" | Jay-Z ft. Alicia Keys | YouTube | |
| Fabienne Terwinghe | 1989 | "Round & Round" | New Order | YouTube | |
| Farida Khelfa | 2026 | "SS26" | Charli XCX | YouTube | |
| Francisco Lachowski | 2016 | "Wolves" | Kanye West | YouTube | |
| Gail Elliott | 1985 | "A View To A Kill" | Duran Duran | YouTube | |
| Gemma Ward | 2004 | "Daughters" | John Mayer | YouTube | |
| Gemma Ward | 2016 | "M.I.L.F. $" | Fergie | YouTube | |
| Georgia Fowler | 2017 | "It Ain't Me" | Kygo and Selena Gomez | YouTube | |
| Gia Carangi | 1980 | "Atomic" | Blondie | | |
| Gigi Hadid | 2014 | "Surfboard" | Cody Simpson | | |
| Gigi Hadid | 2015 | "Simple Things" | Miguel | | |
| Gigi Hadid | 2015 | "Bad Blood" | Taylor Swift ft. Kendrick Lamar | YouTube | |
| Gigi Hadid | 2015 | "Flower" | Cody Simpson | | |
| Gigi Hadid | 2015 | "How Deep Is Your Love" | Calvin Harris and Disciples | YouTube | |
| Gigi Hadid | 2016 | "Pillowtalk" | Zayn | YouTube | |
| Grace Jones | 1981 | "Pull Up to the Bumper" | Herself | YouTube | |
| Grace Jones | 1981 | "I've Seen That Face Before (Libertango)" | Herself | YouTube | |
| Grace Jones | 1985 | "Slave to the Rhythm" | Herself | | |
| Grace Jones | 1985 | "A View to a Kill" | Duran Duran | YouTube | |
| Grace Mahary | 2009 | "I Invented Sex" | Trey Songz | | |
| Grace Mahary | 2010 | "Say Aah" | Trey Songz | | |
| Guntars Asmanis | 2010 | "Back to December" | Taylor Swift | YouTube | |
| Hailey Bieber | 2019 | "10,000 Hours" | Justin Bieber, Dan + Shay | YouTube | |
| Hailey Bieber | 2020 | "Stuck With U" | Justin Bieber and Ariana Grande | YouTube | |
| Hailey Bieber | 2021 | "Anyone" | Justin Bieber | YouTube | |
| Hailey Clauson | 2011 | "Empire State of Mind (Life + Times Version)" | Jay-Z ft. Alicia Keys | YouTube | |
| Halle Arbaugh | 2012 | "I Knew You Were Trouble" | Taylor Swift | YouTube | |
| Halle Arbaugh | 2012 | "Turning Into You" | The Offspring | | |
| Halle Arbaugh | 2012 | "That's Why God Made the Radio" | The Beach Boys | YouTube | |
| Hanne Sagstuen | 2018 | "Sinner" | Conner Boatman | YouTube | |
| Hari Nef | 2015 | "There is Nothing Left" | The Drums | | |
| Heidi Klum | 2002 | "Love Foolosophy" | Jamiroquai | YouTube | |
| Heidi Klum | 2010 | "Secret" | Seal | YouTube | |
| Heidi Klum | 2015 | "Fire Meet Gasoline" | Sia | YouTube | |
| Helena Christensen | 1991 | "Wicked Game" | Chris Isaak | YouTube | |
| Helena Christensen | 2011 | "Girl Panic!" | Duran Duran | YouTube | |
| Helena Christensen | 2014 | "Cherry on Top" | Oh Land | | |
| Iman | 1989 | "On Our Own" | Bobby Brown | YouTube | |
| Iman | 1992 | "Remember the Time" | Michael Jackson | YouTube | |
| Irina Shayk | 2010 | "POWER" | Kanye West | YouTube | |
| Irina Shayk | 2014 | "Yo También" | Romeo Santos ft. Marc Anthony | | |
| Irina Shayk | 2022 | "Waareftek" | Majid Al Mohandis | YouTube | |
| Isabeli Fontana | 2015 | "Meu Bem" | NX Zero | YouTube | |
| Isabeli Fontana | 2016 | "M.I.L.F. $" | Fergie | YouTube | |
| Isabeli Fontana | 2018 | "Indecente" | Anitta | YouTube | |
| Isabeli Fontana | 2018 | "No Mesmo Lugar" | Di Ferrero | YouTube | |
| Iselin Steiro | 2013 | "The Stars (Are Out Tonight)" | David Bowie | YouTube | |
| Izabel Goulart | 2018 | "Indecente" | Anitta | YouTube | |
| Jac Jagaciak | 2015 | "Hands to Myself" (Victoria's Secret video) | Selena Gomez | | |
| Jac Jagaciak | 2016 | "Barn" | Úlfur Úlfur | YouTube | |
| Jaime Edmondson | 2010 | "This Ain't No Love Song" | Trace Adkins | | |
| Jamisin Matthews | 2000 | "Resurrection (Paper, Paper)" | Bone Thugs N Harmony | | |
| Jamisin Matthews | 2001 | "Jezebel" | Chely Wright | | |
| Jamisin Matthews | 2001 | "I'm a Slave 4 U" | Britney Spears | YouTube | |
| Jamisin Matthews | 2001 | "I Cry" | Tammy Cochran | | |
| Jamisin Matthews | 2001 | "Aaroma (of a Man)" | Pru | | |
| Jamisin Matthews | 2002 | "Underneath Your Clothes" | Shakira | YouTube | |
| Jamisin Matthews | 2003 | "Kids" | Kelli Ali | | |
| Jamisin Matthews | 2006 | "Life on the Murder Scene" | My Chemical Romance | | |
| Janine Lindemulder | 1999 | "What's My Age Again?" | Blink 182 | | |
| Jasmine Tookes | 2015 | "Hands to Myself" (Victoria's Secret video) | Selena Gomez | | |
| Jasmine Tookes | 2016 | "Body Moves" (Victoria's Secret video) | DNCE | | |
| Jasmine Tookes | 2017 | "2U" (Victoria's Secret video) | David Guetta ft. Justin Bieber | YouTube | |
| Jeana Tomasino | 1983 | "Sharp Dressed Man" | ZZ Top | | |
| Jeana Tomasino | 1983 | "Gimme All Your Lovin'" | ZZ Top | YouTube | |
| Jeana Tomasino | 1984 | "Legs" | ZZ Top | | |
| Jeanene Fox | 1999 | "Vivrant Thing" | Q-Tip | | |
| Jeanene Fox | 2007 | "Makes Me Wonder" | Maroon 5 | YouTube | |
| Jeneil Williams | 2018 | "Shame" | Maxwell | YouTube | |
| Jennifer Driver | 1994 | "Since I Don't Have You" | Guns N' Roses | YouTube | |
| Jerry Hall | 1976 | "Let's Stick Together" | Bryan Ferry | | |
| Jessi M'Bengue | 2013 | "Blurred Lines" | Robin Thicke | YouTube | |
| Jessica Hahn | 1988 | "Wild Thing" | Sam Kinison | | |
| Jessica Hart | 2009 | "Everything to Me" | Tamarama | YouTube | |
| Jessica White | 2003 | "Change Clothes" | Jay-Z ft. Pharrell | YouTube | |
| Jill Vedder | 2011 | "Longing to Belong" | Eddie Vedder | YouTube | |
| Joan Smalls | 2006 | "It's Alright" | Ricky Martin | | |
| Joan Smalls | 2013 | "Phoenix" | ASAP Rocky | | |
| Joan Smalls | 2014 | "Yoncé" | Beyoncé | YouTube | |
| Joan Smalls | 2016 | "Fuego" | Juanes | | |
| Joan Smalls | 2016 | "Wolves" | Kanye West | YouTube | |
| Joan Smalls | 2018 | "Está Rico" | Marc Anthony ft. Will Smith and Bad Bunny | YouTube | |
| Jon Kortajarena | 2012 | "Girl Gone Wild" | Madonna | YouTube | |
| Jon Kortajarena | 2015 | "Bitch I'm Madonna" | Madonna ft. Nicki Minaj | YouTube | |
| Jon Kortajarena | 2016 | "M.I.L.F. $" | Fergie | YouTube | |
| Jon Kortajarena | 2016 | "Wolves" | Kanye West | YouTube | |
| Jocelyn Chew | 2012 | "Boyfriend" | Justin Bieber | YouTube | |
| Jordan Barrett | 2016 | "M.I.L.F. $" | Fergie | YouTube | |
| Jordan Barrett | 2016 | "Wolves" | Kanye West | YouTube | |
| Josephine Skriver | 2011 | "Empire State of Mind (Life + Times Version)" | Jay-Z ft. Alicia Keys | YouTube | |
| Josephine Skriver | 2014 | "Lock Me Up" | The Cab | | |
| Josephine Skriver | 2015 | "Hands to Myself" (Victoria's Secret video) | Selena Gomez | | |
| Josephine Skriver | 2016 | "Body Moves" (Victoria's Secret video) | DNCE | | |
| Josephine Skriver | 2016 | "Wolves" | Kanye West | YouTube | |
| Jourdan Dunn | 2011 | "Empire State of Mind (Life + Times Version)" | Jay-Z ft. Alicia Keys | YouTube | |
| Jourdan Dunn | 2013 | "It's My Party" | Jessie J | YouTube | |
| Jourdan Dunn | 2013 | "XO" | Beyoncé | YouTube | |
| Jourdan Dunn | 2014 | "Yoncé" | Beyoncé | YouTube | |
| Jourdan Dunn | 2016 | "Wolves" | Kanye West | YouTube | |
| Jourdan Dunn | 2017 | "Regret in Your Tears" | Nicki Minaj | YouTube | |
| Jourdan Dunn | 2018 | "Nice For What" | Drake | YouTube | |
| Joy Bryant | 2011 | "Will Do" | TV on the Radio | YouTube | |
| Julia Bolino | 1986 | "All the Love in the World" | The Outfield | YouTube | |
| Julia Bolino | 1986 | "Addicted To Love" | Robert Palmer | YouTube | |
| Julia Bolino | 1988 | "Simply Irresistible" | Robert Palmer | YouTube | |
| Julie Pankhurst | 1986 | "Addicted To Love" | Robert Palmer | YouTube | |
| Julie Pankhurst | 1988 | "Simply Irresistible" | Robert Palmer | YouTube | |
| Julie Pankhurst | 1990 | "Recipe For Love" | Harry Connick Jr. | | |
| Kaia Gerber | 2019 | "Burnout" | John Eatherly | YouTube | |
| Kaia Gerber | 2020 | "Imagine" | Gal Gadot & Friends | | |
| Kaia Gerber | 2020 | "Crying in the Mirror" | Rainsford | YouTube | |
| Kara Young | 1995 | "Freek'n You" | Jodeci | YouTube | |
| Karen Elson | 2005 | "Blue Orchid" | The White Stripes | YouTube | |
| Karlie Kloss | 2011 | "Empire State of Mind (Life + Times Version)" | Jay-Z ft. Alicia Keys | YouTube | |
| Karlie Kloss | 2015 | "I'll Be There" | CHIC ft. Nile Rodgers | | |
| Karlie Kloss | 2015 | "Bad Blood" | Taylor Swift ft. Kendrick Lamar | YouTube | |
| Kate Grigorieva | 2015 | "Hands to Myself" (Victoria's Secret video) | Selena Gomez | | |
| Kate Groombridge | 2003 | "Incredible (What I Meant to Say)" | Darius | YouTube | |
| Kate Moss | 1991 | "Love Don't Bother Me" | Stage Dolls | | |
| Kate Moss | 1994 | "Delia's Gone" | Johnny Cash | | |
| Kate Moss | 1995 | "Come Together" | The Smokin' Mojo Filters | | |
| Kate Moss | 1997 | "Kowalski" | Primal Scream | | |
| Kate Moss | 1997 | "Something About the Way You Look Tonight" | Elton John | | |
| Kate Moss | 2002 | "Sex With Strangers" | Marianne Faithfull | | |
| Kate Moss | 2002 | "Some Velvet Morning" | Primal Scream | | |
| Kate Moss | 2003 | "I Just Don't Know What to Do with Myself" | The White Stripes | YouTube | |
| Kate Moss | 2006 | "God's Gonna Cut You Down" | Johnny Cash | YouTube | |
| Kate Moss | 2012 | "White Light" | George Michael | YouTube | |
| Kate Moss | 2013 | "Queenie Eye" | Paul McCartney | YouTube | |
| Kate Moss | 2016 | "The Wonder of You" | Elvis Presley | | |
| Kate Moss | 2016 | "Ritual Spirit" | Massive Attack and Azekel | | |
| Kate Upton | 2014 | "Bartender" | Lady Antebellum | | |
| Kathy Davies | 1982 | "Figures" | Zaine Griff | YouTube | |
| Kathy Davies | 1986 | "Addicted To Love" | Robert Palmer | YouTube | |
| Kathy Davies | 1988 | "Simply Irresistible" | Robert Palmer | YouTube | |
| Kathy Hill | 1984 | "Last Christmas" | Wham! | YouTube | |
| Kayla Scott | 2018 | "I Want Your Love" | Lady Gaga | YouTube | |
| Kelly Brook | 1997 | "Megalomaniac" | KMFDM | | |
| Kelly Brook | 1997 | "Help the Aged" | Pulp | | |
| Kelly Gale | 2016 | "Duele el Corazón" | Enrique Iglesias ft. Wisin | YouTube | |
| Kelsey Rogers | 2011 | "Empire State of Mind (Life + Times Version)" | Jay-Z ft. Alicia Keys | YouTube | |
| Kendall Jenner | 2010 | "BlackLight" | One Call | | |
| Kendall Jenner | 2014 | "Recognize" | PartyNextDoor ft. Drake | | |
| Kendall Jenner | 2016 | "Where's the Love" | The Black Eyed Peas ft. The World | YouTube | |
| Kendall Jenner | 2017 | "Enchanté (Carine)" | Fergie ft. Axl Jack | | |
| Kendall Jenner | 2018 | "Freaky Friday" | Lil Dicky ft. Chris Brown | YouTube | |
| Kim Smith | 2000 | "Bye Bye Bye" | NSYNC | YouTube | |
| Kim Smith | 2000 | "It's Gonna Be Me" | NSYNC | YouTube | |
| Kim Smith | 2002 | "Girls of Summer" | Aerosmith | YouTube | |
| Kim Smith | 2007 | "Wake Up Call" | Maroon 5 | YouTube | |
| Kristina Romanova | 2013 | "Wake Me Up" | Avicii ft. Aloe Blacc | YouTube | |
| Kristina Salinovic | 2011 | "Empire State of Mind (Life + Times Version)" | Jay-Z ft. Alicia Keys | YouTube | |
| Kristine Froseth | 2016 | "False Alarm" | The Weeknd | YouTube | |
| Ksenia Sukhinova | 2017 | "Derzhi" | Dima Bilan | YouTube | |
| Kyla Coleman | 2019 | "Don't Start Now" | Dua Lipa | YouTube | |
| Kylie Jenner | 2015 | "Stimulated" | Tyga | | |
| Kylie Jenner | 2015 | "Dope'd Up" | Tyga | | |
| Kylie Jenner | 2016 | "Come and See Me" | PartyNextDoor ft. Drake | | |
| Kylie Jenner | 2018 | "Stop Trying to Be God" | Travis Scott | YouTube | |
| Kylie Jenner | 2020 | "WAP" | Cardi B ft. Megan Thee Stallion | YouTube | |
| Kymberley Herrin | 1984 | "Legs" | ZZ Top | | |
| Kymberley Herrin | 1984 | "California Girls" | David Lee Roth | | |
| Kymberley Herrin | 1987 | "KISS Exposed" | Kiss | | |
| Laetitia Casta | 1995 | "Baby Did a Bad Bad Thing" | Chris Isaak | YouTube | |
| Laetitia Casta | 2001 | "Gourmandises" | Alizée | YouTube | |
| Laetitia Casta | 2010 | "Te Amo" | Rihanna | YouTube | |
| Lais Ribeiro | 2015 | "Hands to Myself" (Victoria's Secret video) | Selena Gomez | | |
| Lais Ribeiro | 2017 | "Paradinha" | Anitta | YouTube | |
| Lais Ribeiro | 2019 | "Switch" | Afrojack X Jewelz & Sparks ft. Emmalyn | | |
| Laith Ashley | 2022 | "Lavender Haze" | Taylor Swift | YouTube | |
| Lara Stone | 2012 | "Night & Day" | Hot Chip | YouTube | |
| Lara Stone | 2015 | "Weight of Love" | The Black Keys | | |
| Lexi Boling | 2018 | "I Want Your Love" | Lady Gaga | YouTube | |
| Lida Fox | 2018 | "I Want Your Love" | Lady Gaga | YouTube | |
| Liliana Domínguez | 2003 | "Change Clothes" | Jay-Z ft. Pharrell | YouTube | |
| Lillian Müller | 1978 | "Da Ya Think I'm Sexy?" | Rod Stewart | YouTube | |
| Lillian Müller | 1984 | "Hot for Teacher" | Van Halen | YouTube | |
| Lily Aldridge | 2000 | "Break Stuff" | Limp Bizkit | | |
| Lily Aldridge | 2008 | "Use Somebody" | Kings of Leon | YouTube | |
| Lily Aldridge | 2013 | "Temple" | Kings of Leon | | |
| Lily Aldridge | 2015 | "Bad Blood" | Taylor Swift ft. Kendrick Lamar | YouTube | |
| Lily Aldridge | 2015 | "Hands to Myself" (Victoria's Secret video) | Selena Gomez | | |
| Lily Aldridge | 2016 | "Body Moves" (Victoria's Secret video) | DNCE | | |
| Lily Cole | 2012 | "UK Shanty" | Clean Bandit ft. Eliza Shaddad | | |
| Lily Cole | 2013 | "Sacrilege" | Yeah Yeah Yeahs | YouTube | |
| Lily Cole | 2013 | "Queenie Eye" | Paul McCartney | YouTube | |
| Lily Cole | 2020 | "Thanks for the Dance" | Leonard Cohen | | |
| Lily McMenamy | 2015 | "Weight of Love" | The Black Keys | | |
| Linda Evangelista | 1990 | "Freedom! '90" | George Michael | YouTube | |
| Linda Evangelista | 1992 | "Too Funky" | George Michael | YouTube | |
| Ling Tan | 1996 | "Fastlove" | George Michael | | |
| Lisa Barbuscia | 1993 | "Glam" | Herself (as "Lisa B.") | | |
| Lisa Barbuscia | 1993 | "Fascinated" | Herself (as "Lisa B.") | | |
| Lisa Barbuscia | 1993 | "You & Me" | Herself (as "Lisa B.") | | |
| Lisa Stahl | 1984 | "Careless Whisper" | George Michael | YouTube | |
| Lisa Vanderpump | 1982 | "Poison Arrow" | ABC | YouTube | |
| Lonneke Engel | 1996 | "Se a vida é (That's the Way Life Is)" | Pet Shop Boys | YouTube | |
| Lonneke Engel | 2004 | "Love Comes Again" | Tiësto | | |
| Louise Parker | 2015 | "Weight of Love" | The Black Keys | | |
| Lucky Blue Smith | 2018 | "I Want Your Love" | Lady Gaga | YouTube | |
| Luisana Lopilato | 2010 | "Haven't Met You Yet" | Michael Bublé | YouTube | |
| Luka Sabbat | 2018 | "No Stylist" | French Montana ft. Drake | YouTube | |
| Lulu Tenney | 2017 | "I Dare You" | The xx | YouTube | |
| Lydia Hearst | 2009 | "This Must Be the Place (Naive Melody)" | Miles Fisher | YouTube | |
| Lydia Hearst | 2012 | "Song for All the Girls" | Cisco Adler featuring Young Chris | YouTube | |
| Lydia Hearst | 2012 | "LimoSexSuperstar" | Johnny Polygon | YouTube | |
| Lydia Hearst | 2019 | "A$$ Level" | Santina Muha | YouTube | |
| Lysette Anthony | 1984 | "Run to You" | Bryan Adams | YouTube | |
| Lysette Anthony | 1985 | "Heaven" | Bryan Adams | YouTube | |
| Lysette Anthony | 1985 | "Somebody" | Bryan Adams | YouTube | |
| Lysette Anthony | 1985 | "Summer of '69" | Bryan Adams | | |
| Lysette Anthony | 1993 | "I Feel You" | Depeche Mode | YouTube | |
| Lysette Anthony | 2010 | "Cruel Intentions" | Simian Mobile Disco | | |
| Maggie Laine | 2017 | "Coastline" | Shwayze ft. W!ldcard | YouTube | |
| Mak Gilchrist | 1986 | "Addicted To Love" | Robert Palmer | YouTube | |
| Malaika Firth | 2015 | "Not Letting Go" | Tinie Tempah ft. Jess Glynne | | |
| Maria Borges | 2016 | "Wolves" | Kanye West | YouTube | |
| Maria Borges | 2018 | "Shame" | Maxwell | YouTube | |
| Marianne Gravatte | 1985 | "Lay It Down" | Ratt | YouTube | |
| Martha Hunt | 2014 | "Stay Forever" | Panama | YouTube | |
| Martha Hunt | 2015 | "Hands to Myself" (Victoria's Secret video) | Selena Gomez | | |
| Martha Hunt | 2015 | "Bad Blood" | Taylor Swift ft. Kendrick Lamar | YouTube | |
| Martha Hunt | 2016 | "Body Moves" (Victoria's Secret video) | DNCE | | |
| Martha Hunt | 2017 | "Paris" | The Chainsmokers | | |
| Martha Hunt | 2017 | "2U" (Victoria's Secret video) | David Guetta ft. Justin Bieber | YouTube | |
| Martha Streck | 2011 | "Empire State of Mind (Life + Times Version)" | Jay-Z ft. Alicia Keys | YouTube | |
| Maryna Linchuk | 2013 | "Waves" | Mr Probz | | |
| Matvey Lykov | 2013 | "I Love You" | Woodkid | YouTube | |
| Meghan Wiggins | 2014 | "Maps" | Maroon 5 | YouTube | |
| Mica Arganaraz | 2018 | "I Want Your Love" | Lady Gaga | YouTube | |
| Miranda Kerr | 2003 | "Everything to Me" | Tamarama | | |
| Miranda Kerr | 2006 | "Number One" | Pharrell ft. Kanye West | | |
| Miranda Kerr | 2014 | "You're the Boss" | Bobby Fox ft. Miranda Kerr | | (Note: Miranda Kerr also provides a vocal performance for the song.) |
| Mona Tougaard | 2024 | "Perfect Stranger" | FKA Twigs | YouTube | |
| Myka Dunkle | 1997 | "Electric Barbarella" | Duran Duran | | |
| Nadine Leopold | 2015 | "Drunk on Your Love" | Brett Eldredge | YouTube | |
| Nadja Auermann | 1992 | "Too Funky" | George Michael | YouTube | |
| Naomi Campbell | 1978 | "Is This Love" | Bob Marley and the Wailers | | |
| Naomi Campbell | 1983 | "I'll Tumble 4 Ya" | Culture Club | | |
| Naomi Campbell | 1990 | "Freedom! '90" | George Michael | YouTube | |
| Naomi Campbell | 1991 | "Cool as Ice (Everybody Get Loose)" | Vanilla Ice | | (Note: Naomi Campbell also provides a vocal performance for the song.) |
| Naomi Campbell | 1992 | "In the Closet" | Michael Jackson | YouTube | |
| Naomi Campbell | 1992 | "Erotica" | Madonna | YouTube | |
| Naomi Campbell | 1993 | "Numb" | U2 | YouTube | |
| Naomi Campbell | 1994 | "Love and Tears" | Herself | | |
| Naomi Campbell | 2003 | "Change Clothes" | Jay-Z ft. Pharrell | YouTube | |
| Naomi Campbell | 2011 | "Girl Panic!" | Duran Duran | YouTube | |
| Naomi Campbell | 2016 | "Drone Bomb Me" | Anohni | Apple Music | |
| Naomi Campbell | 2019 | "Brown Skin Girl" (Black is King video) | Beyoncé ft. Saint Jhn & Wizkid | YouTube | |
| Naoumi Ekiko | 2011 | "Empire State of Mind (Life + Times Version)" | Jay-Z ft. Alicia Keys | YouTube | |
| Natalia Vodianova | 2002 | "I Get Along" | Pet Shop Boys | YouTube | |
| Natalia Vodianova | 2015 | «Не молчи» (Don't Be Silent) | Dima Bilan | YouTube | |
| Natalie Morris | 2012 | "Finally Found You" | Enrique Iglesias ft Sammy Adams | YouTube | |
| Natasha Poly | 2016 | "M.I.L.F. $" | Fergie | YouTube | |
| Nazanin Mandi | 2006 | "Dime Piece" | Nick Cannon ft. Izzy | | |
| Nazanin Mandi | 2007 | "Anonymous" | Bobby Valentino ft. Timbaland | YouTube | |
| Nazanin Mandi | 2011 | "Girls Like You" | Miguel | | |
| Nazanin Mandi | 2012 | "Do You..." | Miguel | | |
| Nicole Marie Lenz | 2005 | "What Happens Tomorrow" | Duran Duran | | |
| Nina Brosh | 1994 | Femme Fatale | Duran Duran | | |
| Nina Morić | 1999 | "Livin' la Vida Loca" | Ricky Martin | YouTube | |
| Nisha Adhikari | 2011 | "Never Gonna Leave This Bed" | Maroon 5 | YouTube | |
| Noah Mills | 2012 | "We Are Never Ever Getting Back Together" | Taylor Swift | YouTube | |
| Ola Ray | 1982 | "Thriller" | Michael Jackson | | |
| Olga Kurylenko | 2003 | "Love's Divine" | Seal | YouTube | |
| Omahyra Mota | 2003 | "Change Clothes" | Jay-Z ft. Pharrell | YouTube | |
| Oran Katan | 2013 | "Rak Bishvilo" | Moran Mazor | | |
| Paloma Elsesser | 2018 | "Bad Bad News" | Leon Bridges | | |
| Patricia Barzyk | 1984 | "New Moon on Monday" | Duran Duran | | |
| Patty Kelly | 1986 | "Addicted To Love" | Robert Palmer | YouTube | |
| Patty Kelly | 1988 | "Simply Irresistible" | Robert Palmer | YouTube | |
| Paulina Porizkova | 1984 | "Drive" | The Cars | YouTube | |
| Poppy Delevingne | 2004 | "Sunday Morning" | Maroon 5 | YouTube | |
| Poppy Delevingne | 2017 | "Sing Out" | Herself and Karen Elson | | |
| R'el Dade | 2011 | "Empire State of Mind (Life + Times Version)" | Jay-Z ft. Alicia Keys | YouTube | |
| Rachel Hilbert | 2015 | "Lose My Mind" | Brett Eldredge | YouTube | |
| Rachel Hunter | 2003 | "Stacy's Mom" | Fountains of Wayne | YouTube | |
| Rachel Roberts | 2015 | "Bitch Better Have My Money" | Rihanna | | |
| Rachel Williams | 1996 | "Fastlove" | George Michael | | |
| Rachel Williams | 1996 | "Never Never Love" | Simply Red | | |
| Raina Hein | 2011 | "Calgary" | Bon Iver | | |
| Raina Hein | 2013 | "Girls" | The 1975 | | |
| Raina Hein | 2014 | "Best Friend" | Foster the People | | |
| Raina Hein | 2015 | "Sugar" | Maroon 5 | | |
| Rana Kennedy | 1989 | "Poison" | Alice Cooper | YouTube | |
| Raquel Zimmermann | 2011 | "Born This Way" | Lady Gaga | | |
| Rebecca Romijn | 1988 | "Please Don't Go Girl" (Coney Island version) | New Kids On The Block | YouTube | |
| Reema Ruspoli | 1982 | "Rio" | Duran Duran | | |
| Rianne ten Haken | 2014 | "The Chamber" | Lenny Kravitz | | |
| Riley Montana | 2018 | "Shame" | Maxwell | YouTube | |
| Riley Montana | 2016 | "Wolves" | Kanye West | YouTube | |
| Rob Evans | 2012 | "Girl Gone Wild" | Madonna | YouTube | |
| Rocky Barnes | 2012 | "Boyfriend" | Justin Bieber | | |
| Romee Strijd | 2015 | "Hands to Myself" (Victoria's Secret video) | Selena Gomez | | |
| Romee Strijd | 2016 | "Wolves" | Kanye West | YouTube | |
| Romee Strijd | 2016 | "Body Moves" (Victoria's Secret video) | DNCE | | |
| Romee Strijd | 2017 | "2U" (Victoria's Secret video) | David Guetta ft. Justin Bieber | YouTube | |
| Ronald Epps | 2016 | "Wolves" | Kanye West | YouTube | |
| Rosetta Millington | 1988 | "Pamela" | Toto | | |
| Rosie Huntington-Whiteley | 2006 | "Number One" | Pharrell ft. Kanye West | | |
| Rubi Rose | 2016 | "Bad and Boujee" | Migos ft. Lil Uzi Vert | | |
| Rubi Rose | 2020 | "WAP" | Cardi B ft. Megan Thee Stallion | YouTube | |
| Ruth Bell | 2016 | "American Valhalla" | Iggy Pop | | |
| Sabrina Nait | 2011 | "Empire State of Mind (Life + Times Version)" | Jay-Z ft. Alicia Keys | YouTube | |
| Sabrina Salerno | 1987 | "Boys (Summertime Love)" | Herself (as "Sabrina") | | |
| Sacha Senisch | 2009 | "A Looking in View" | Alice in Chains | YouTube | |
| Sacha Senisch | 2010 | "A Beautiful Day" | Seven Saturdays | YouTube | |
| Sacha Senisch | 2010 | "Between the Lines" | Stone Temple Pilots | YouTube | |
| Sacha Senisch | 2011 | "Well of Love" | Mason Jennings | YouTube via Archive.org | |
| Sacha Senisch | 2013 | "The Socks Song" | Shay Butler | YouTube | |
| Sade | 1984 | "Your Love Is King" | Herself | YouTube | |
| Sade | 1984 | "Smooth Operator" | Herself | YouTube | |
| Sade | 1984 | "When Am I Going to Make a Living" | Herself | YouTube | |
| Sade | 1984 | "Hang On to Your Love" | Herself | YouTube | |
| Sade | 1985 | "The Sweetest Taboo" | Herself | YouTube | |
| Sade | 1985 | "Is It a Crime?" | Herself | YouTube | |
| Sade | 1992 | "No Ordinary Love" | Herself | YouTube | |
| Salem Mitchell | 2017 | "Bartier Cardi" | Cardi B ft. 21 Savage | YouTube | |
| Salem Mitchell | 2017 | "Young Dumb & Broke" | Khalid | YouTube | |
| Salem Mitchell | 2018 | "Broken Clocks" | SZA | | |
| Salem Mitchell | 2021 | "Brutal" | Olivia Rodrigo | | |
| Samantha Fox | 1986 | "Touch Me (I Want Your Body)" | Herself | YouTube | |
| Samantha Fox | 1987 | "Nothing's Gonna Stop Me Now" | Herself | YouTube | |
| Samantha Fox | 1987 | "I Surrender (To the Spirit of the Night)" | Herself | YouTube | |
| Sandra Kubicka | 2012 | "All Aboard" | Romeo Santos ft. Lil Wayne | YouTube | |
| Sara Cox | 1993 | "Everyday" | Orchestral Manoeuvres in the Dark | YouTube | |
| Sara Sampaio | 2015 | "Hands to Myself" (Victoria's Secret video) | Selena Gomez | | |
| Sara Sampaio | 2016 | "Chainsaw" | Nick Jonas | | |
| Sara Sampaio | 2016 | "Wolves" | Kanye West | YouTube | |
| Sara Sampaio | 2016 | "Body Moves" (Victoria's Secret video) | DNCE | | |
| Sara Sampaio | 2017 | "2U" (Victoria's Secret video) | David Guetta ft. Justin Bieber | YouTube | |
| Sarah Donna | 2020 | "Gnat" | Eminem | YouTube | |
| Sarah Donna | 2021 | "Giving What It's Supposed to Give" | DaBaby | | |
| Sarah Donna | 2021 | "Lonely" | DaBaby ft. Lil Wayne | YouTube | |
| Sarah Stage | 2009 | "Your Decision" | Alice in Chains | YouTube | |
| Sasha Luss | 2016 | "Wolves" | Kanye West | YouTube | |
| Saskia de Brauw | 2013 | "The Stars (Are Out Tonight)" | David Bowie | YouTube | |
| Sean O'Pry | 2012 | "Girl Gone Wild" | Madonna | YouTube | |
| Sean O'Pry | 2014 | "Blank Space" | Taylor Swift | | |
| Selita Ebanks | 2006 | "Number One" | Pharrell ft. Kanye West | | |
| Selita Ebanks | 2010 | "Make Up Bag" | The-Dream ft. T.I. | | |
| Selita Ebanks | 2010 | "Runaway" (musical short film) | Kanye West | | |
| Selita Ebanks | 2011 | "Empire State of Mind (Life + Times Version)" | Jay-Z ft. Alicia Keys | YouTube | |
| Shana Zadrick | 1992 | "Too Funky" | George Michael | YouTube | |
| Shana Zadrick | 1994 | "Wild Night" | John Mellencamp ft. Meshell Ndegeocello | | |
| Shanina Shaik | 2015 | "Do What You Like" | Taio Cruz | | |
| Sharise Ruddell | 1987 | "Girls, Girls, Girls" | Mötley Crüe | | |
| Sharni Vinson | 2010 | "My Own Step" | Roscoe Dash and T-Pain ft. Fabo | | |
| Sharni Vinson | 2012 | "Put Your Hands Up" | Matchbox Twenty | | |
| Sharina Gutierrez | 2017 | "To My Bed" | Chris Brown | YouTube | |
| Sheila Ming-Burgess | 1981 | "She's Got Claws" | Gary Numan | YouTube | |
| Sheila Ming-Burgess | 1982 | "Hungry Like the Wolf" | Duran Duran | YouTube | |
| Sheila Ming-Burgess | 1985 | "Saving All My Love For You" | Whitney Houston | YouTube | |
| Shelley Hennig | 2014 | "Gentle On My Mind" | The Band Perry | | |
| Shelley Hennig | 2017 | "I Could Use a Love Song" | Maren Morris | | |
| Shu Pei | 2011 | "Empire State of Mind (Life + Times Version)" | Jay-Z ft. Alicia Keys | YouTube | |
| Simon Nessman | 2012 | "Girl Gone Wild" | Madonna | YouTube | |
| Sira Kante | 2018 | "Shame" | Maxwell | YouTube | |
| Sita Abellán | 2015 | "Bitch Better Have My Money" | Rihanna | | |
| Sonia Niekrasz | 2011 | "Empire State of Mind (Life + Times Version)" | Jay-Z ft. Alicia Keys | YouTube | |
| Sophie Dahl | 1997 | "Electric Barbarella" | Duran Duran | YouTube | |
| Sophie Dahl | 1997 | "Something About the Way You Look Tonight" | Elton John | | |
| Sophie Dahl | 1997 | "Last Night on Earth" | U2 | YouTube | |
| Stella Maxwell | 2015 | "Hands to Myself" (Victoria's Secret video) | Selena Gomez | | |
| Stella Maxwell | 2016 | "Body Moves" (Victoria's Secret video) | DNCE | | |
| Stella Maxwell | 2017 | "2U" (Victoria's Secret video) | David Guetta ft. Justin Bieber | YouTube | |
| Stella Maxwell | 2018 | "Like That" | Kris Wu | | |
| Stephanie Corneliussen | 2012 | "She's So Mean" | Matchbox Twenty | | |
| Stephanie Seymour | 1991 | "Don't Cry" | Guns N' Roses | YouTube | |
| Stephanie Seymour | 1992 | "November Rain" | Guns N' Roses | YouTube | |
| Stephanie Sigman | 2014 | "Snap Out of It" | Arctic Monkeys | YouTube | |
| Stormi Henley | 2017 | "I Don't Want U Back" | Børns | | |
| Stormi Henley | 2018 | "Intangible" | Herself | YouTube | |
| Suki Waterhouse | 2019 | "Nightmare" | Halsey | YouTube | |
| Summer Bartholomew | 1988 | "Look Away" | Chicago | YouTube | |
| Sunny Mabrey | 1999 | "Nookie" | Limp Bizkit | | |
| Sunny Mabrey | 1999 | "Amazed" | Lonestar | YouTube | |
| Susan Hatten | 1988 | "Fallen Angel" | Poison | YouTube | |
| Sydney Edmonds | 2011 | "Empire State of Mind (Life + Times Version)" | Jay-Z ft. Alicia Keys | YouTube | |
| Tabria Majors | 2020 | "Body" | Megan Thee Stallion | YouTube | |
| Tamara Nowy | 1985 | "Kayleigh" | Marillion | YouTube | |
| Tammy Parra | 2025 | "BRONCEADOR" | Maluma | YouTube | |
| Tania Coleridge | 1987 | "Father Figure" | George Michael | YouTube | |
| Tania Coleridge | 1991 | "Poundcake" | Van Halen | YouTube | |
| Tania Coleridge | 1991 | "Twisted" | Kane Roberts | | |
| Tara Lynn | 2016 | "M.I.L.F. $" | Fergie | YouTube | |
| Tarun Nijjer | 2018 | "I Want Your Love" | Lady Gaga | YouTube | |
| Tatiana Kovylina | 2007 | "Falling Down" | Duran Duran | YouTube | |
| Tatjana Patitz | 1987 | "Skin Trade" | Duran Duran | YouTube | |
| Tatjana Patitz | 1988 | "Tell Me" | Nick Kamen | YouTube | |
| Tatjana Patitz | 1990 | "Freedom! '90" | George Michael | YouTube | |
| Tatjana Patitz | 2000 | "Make Me Bad" | Korn | YouTube | |
| Taylor Hill | 2015 | "Hands to Myself" (Victoria's Secret video) | Selena Gomez | | |
| Taylor Hill | 2016 | "Body Moves" (Victoria's Secret video) | DNCE | | |
| Taylor Warren | 2010 | "Monster" | Kanye West ft. Jay-Z, Rick Ross, Nicki Minaj & Bon Iver | | |
| Tawny Kitaen | 1984 | "Back for More" | Ratt | YouTube | |
| Tawny Kitaen | 1987 | "Still of the Night" | Whitesnake | YouTube | |
| Tawny Kitaen | 1987 | "Is This Love" | Whitesnake | YouTube | |
| Tawny Kitaen | 1987 | "Here I Go Again" | Whitesnake | YouTube | |
| Tawny Kitaen | 1989 | "Fool for Your Loving" (Version 2) | Whitesnake | YouTube | |
| Tawny Kitaen | 1990 | "The Deeper the Love" | Whitesnake | YouTube | |
| Teresa Lourenco | 2000 | "Again" | Lenny Kravitz | YouTube | |
| Tereza Kačerová | 2014 | "Maps" | Maroon 5 | YouTube | |
| Tereza Kačerová | 2018 | "Curious" | Hayley Kiyoko | YouTube | |
| Tereza Kačerová | 2019 | "Dangerous" | Iris | YouTube | |
| Tess Daly | 1990 | "Serious" | Duran Duran | YouTube | |
| Tess Daly | 1990 | "Violence of Summer (Love's Taking Over)" | Duran Duran | YouTube | |
| Tess Daly | 1993 | "Sweet Harmony" | The Beloved | YouTube | |
| Thomas Gibbons | 2018 | "I Want Your Love" | Lady Gaga | YouTube | |
| Tommy Playboy | 2020 | "La Luz" | Thalía and Myke Towers | YouTube | |
| Toni Garrn | 2011 | "Empire State of Mind (Life + Times Version)" | Jay-Z ft. Alicia Keys | YouTube | |
| Toni Garrn | 2018 | "La Cintura" | Alvaro Soler | YouTube | |
| Toni Garrn | 2019 | "Rather Be Alone" | Robin Schulz, Nick Martin and Sam Martin | YouTube | |
| Toni Garrn | 2020 | "In Your Eyes" | Robin Schulz ft. Alida | YouTube | |
| Tony Ward | 1988 | "King Without a Crown" | ABC | YouTube | |
| Tony Ward | 1988 | "I Get Weak" | Belinda Carlisle | YouTube | |
| Tony Ward | 1989 | "Cherish" | Madonna | YouTube | |
| Tony Ward | 1989 | "Like a Prayer" | Madonna | YouTube | |
| Tony Ward | 1989 | "With Every Beat of My Heart" | Taylor Dayne | YouTube | |
| Tony Ward | 1990 | "Justify My Love" | Madonna | YouTube | |
| Tony Ward | 1992 | "Erotica" | Madonna | YouTube | |
| Tony Ward | 1996 | "Fastlove" | George Michael | YouTube | |
| Tracy Martinson | 1987 | "Save Your Love" | Great White | YouTube | |
| Tracy Martinson | 1987 | "Rock Me" | Great White | YouTube | |
| Tyra Banks | 1991 | "Love Thing" | Tina Turner | YouTube | |
| Tyra Banks | 1991 | "Black or White" | Michael Jackson | YouTube | |
| Tyra Banks | 1992 | "Too Funky" | George Michael | YouTube | |
| Tyra Banks | 1996 | "Don't Wanna Lose You" | Lionel Richie | YouTube | |
| Valery Kaufman | 2018 | "I Want Your Love" | Lady Gaga | YouTube | |
| Vanya Seager | 1982 | "Hungry Like the Wolf" | Duran Duran | YouTube | |
| Vanya Seager | 1982 | "Lonely in Your Nightmare" | Duran Duran | YouTube | |
| Vasa Nestorović | 2009 | "Just Get Out of My Life" | Andrea Demirović | YouTube | |
| Veronica Webb | 1985 | "Perfect Way" | Scritti Politti | YouTube | |
| Veronica Webb | 1985 | "Wood Beez (Pray Like Aretha Franklin)" | Scritti Politti | | (Note: Veronica Webb appears in the US version of Scritti Politti's "Wood Beez" video.) |
| Veronica Webb | 1989 | "Round & Round" | New Order | YouTube | |
| Veronica Webb | 1995 | "Freek'n You" | Jodeci | YouTube | |
| Victoria Lee | 2018 | "Brooklyn" | Connor Leimer | YouTube | |
| Victoria Sekrier | 2026 | "SS26" | Charli XCX | YouTube | |
| Wallis Day | 2014 | "On My Way" | Lea Michele | YouTube | |
| Wallis Day | 2014 | "Arabella" | Arctic Monkeys | YouTube | |
| Wallis Day | 2014 | "She Looks So Perfect" | 5 Seconds of Summer | YouTube | |
| Wallis Franken | 1990 | "Justify My Love" | Madonna | YouTube | |
| Willa Ford | 2002 | "In a Little While" | Uncle Kracker | YouTube | |
| Willa Ford | 2010 | "Burn It Down" | Awolnation | YouTube | |
| Winnie Harlow | 2014 | "Guts Over Fear" | Eminem ft. Sia | YouTube | |
| Winnie Harlow | 2014 | "The One" | JMSN | | |
| Winnie Harlow | 2016 | "Forward" | Beyoncé | | |
| Winnie Harlow | 2016 | "Freedom" | Beyoncé ft. Kendrick Lamar | | |
| Winnie Harlow | 2018 | "Promises" | Calvin Harris ft. Sam Smith | YouTube | |
| Xenia Deli | 2013 | "Thinking About You" | Calvin Harris ft. Ayah Marar | YouTube | |
| Xenia Deli | 2015 | "What Do You Mean?" | Justin Bieber | YouTube | |
| Xiao Wen Ju | 2018 | "I Want Your Love" | Lady Gaga | YouTube | |
| Yasmin Le Bon | 1992 | "Who Is It" | Michael Jackson | YouTube | |
| Yasmin Le Bon | 2011 | "Girl Panic!" | Duran Duran | YouTube | |
| Yasmin Wijnaldum | 2019 | "K I D S" | G-Eazy ft. Dex Lauper | YouTube | |
| Yasmin Wijnaldum | 2019 | "Don't Start Now" | Dua Lipa | YouTube | |
| Yoav Reuveni | 2011 | "Mon meilleur amour" | Anggun | YouTube | |
| Yonatan Wagman | 2012 | "Echo (You and I)" | Anggun | YouTube | |
| Ysaunny Brito | 2016 | "Wolves" | Kanye West | YouTube | |
| Zuleyka Rivera | 2017 | "Despacito" | Luis Fonsi ft. Daddy Yankee | YouTube | |
| Zuzanna Bijoch | 2011 | "Empire State of Mind (Life + Times Version)" | Jay-Z ft. Alicia Keys | YouTube | |
| Izabella Miko | 2005 | "Mr. Brightside" | The Killers | YouTube | |
| Izabella Miko | 2012 | "Miss Atomic Bomb” | The Killers | Youtube | |
| Tyson Beckford | 1993 | "Breathe Again" | Toni Braxton | YouTube | |
| Tyson Beckford | 1995 | "One More Chance" | The Notorious B.I.G. | YouTube | |
| Tyson Beckford | 1996 | "Un-Break My Heart" | Toni Braxton | YouTube | |
| Tyson Beckford | 2003 | "21 Questions" | 50 Cent ft. Nate Dogg | YouTube | |
| Tyson Beckford | 2004 | "Toxic" | Britney Spears | YouTube | |
| Tyson Beckford | 2008 | "Go Hard" | DJ Khaled ft. Kanye West & T-Pain | YouTube | |
| Tyson Beckford | 2014 | "Giant" | Sharon Leal | YouTube | |
| Tyson Beckford | 2015 | "Infinity" | Mariah Carey | YouTube | |
| Tyson Beckford | 2022 | "2 Be Loved (Am I Ready)" | Lizzo | YouTube | |
| Karen Morton | 1981 | "867-5309/Jenny" | Tommy Tutone | YouTube | |
