= Promise Tour =

1985–86 concert tour by Sade

- Tour by Sade
- Poster to the concert in Brussels, Belgium
- Associated album: Promise
- Start date: November 1985
- End date: June 1986
- Legs: 4
- No. of shows: United States; Europe; Japan; Australia

Sade concert chronology
- Diamond Life Tour (1984); Promise Tour (1985–1986); Stronger Than Pride Tour (1988)

Promise Tour was the second concert tour by British band Sade that lasted for eight months. Visiting the United States, Europe, Japan, and Australia the tour supported the band's second studio album, Promise. During the tour, rumours of strange behaviour began to circulate about the lead singer Adu. The last three dates of the tour were cancelled due to the critical illness of a band member's mother.

== Set list ==
This set list is representative of the show on February 22, 1986 in Forest, Belgium. It does not represent all shows during the tour.

1. "Why Can't We Live Together"
2. "Cherry Pie"
3. "Smooth Operator"
4. "Red Eye"
5. "War of the Hearts"
6. "Keep Hanging On"
7. "Fear"
8. "Your Love Is King"
9. "Mr. Wrong"
10. "Never as Good as the First Time"
11. "Maureen"
12. "Sally"
13. "Snake Bite"
14. "Is It a Crime?"
15. "The Sweetest Taboo"
16. "Jezebel"
