= Leimer =

Leimer is a surname. Notable people with the surname include:

- Connor Leimer (born 1996), American singer-songwriter
- Fabio Leimer (born 1989), Swiss racing driver
- Karl Leimer (1858–1944) was a German music teacher and pianist
- K. Leimer (Kerry Leimer), American electronic musician
- Kurt Leimer (1920–1974), German concert pianist, composer and piano instructor
