= Nakano Sunplaza =

Hotel building in Tokyo, Japan

Coordinates: 35.707522°N 139.664684°E

- 中野サンプラザ
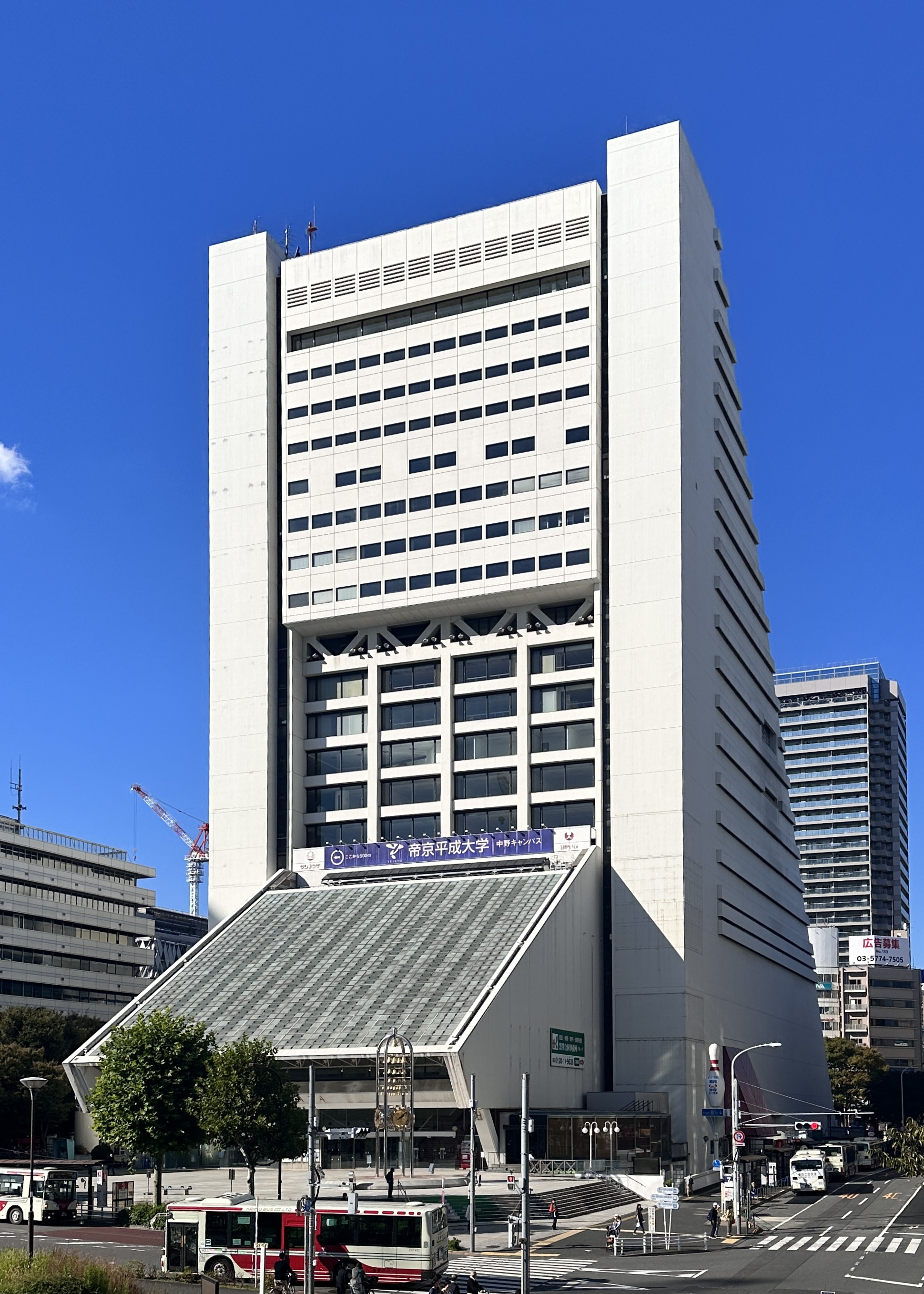
- Former names: Nakano Sun Plaza

General information
- Location: 4-1-1 Nakano, Nakano, Tokyo, Japan
- Completed: 1973
- Opening: June 1, 1973
- Closed: July 2, 2023

Height
- Roof: 92 meters (302 ft)

Technical details
- Floor count: 22 above ground 3 below ground
- Floor area: 51.075081 m^{2} (549.76760 sq ft)

Design and construction
- Structural engineer: Nikken Sekkei Ltd.
- Main contractor: Obayashi Corporation

Other information
- Seating capacity: 2,222

Nakano Sunplaza (中野サンプラザ, Nakano Sanpuraza) was a Japanese concert hall and hotel complex located in Nakano, Tokyo. It opened in 1973 and closed in 2023. The future of the complex is uncertain, with further plans likely coming in March 2026.

== History ==
=== Notable events ===
Numerous musical events and performances were held in the 2,222 seat concert hall. Sarah Vaughan's 1973 album Live in Japan was recorded at the hall. Scorpions recorded their legendary live album, Tokyo Tapes, at this venue on April 24 & 27, 1978. Dolly Parton held a concert in Japan, with her visit taking place in July 1979, where she completed four sold-out shows, including a performance at Tokyo's Nakano Sun Plaza Hall. Her performances in Japan were part of a multi-country tour that also included stops in England, Australia, Brazil, and South Africa. Kraftwerk performed two dates here in 1981 on their Computer World tour. After the departure of Keith Levene and Jah Wobble, Public Image Ltd consisting of John Lydon, Martin Atkins and session musicians played live at the Sunplaza on the 1 and 2 July 1983. 10 tracks from these live performances were first released on Columbia Records Japan as Live in Tokyo. Iron Maiden performed here (1981, 1982, 1985, 1996 and 1998). U2 ended their War Tour on November 30, 1983, at the plaza hall. On May 11, 1986 Sade performed as part of their Promise Tour. Todd Rundgren recorded his live video Live in Japan at the hall during his Nearly Human tour in 1990. The Japanese metal band Dead End held their last concert here on January 21, 1990. Nirvana held their final Japanese concert here on February 19, 1992. The concert portions of Dream Theater's Images and Words: Live in Tokyo video were filmed at the hall. DJ Ozma filmed his 2008 concert "Viva la Scandal Party" at the Nakano Sunplaza stop of the tour. Highlights were released as part of the exclusive box set of his final album, "I ♡ Party People 3".

=== Closure and Response ===
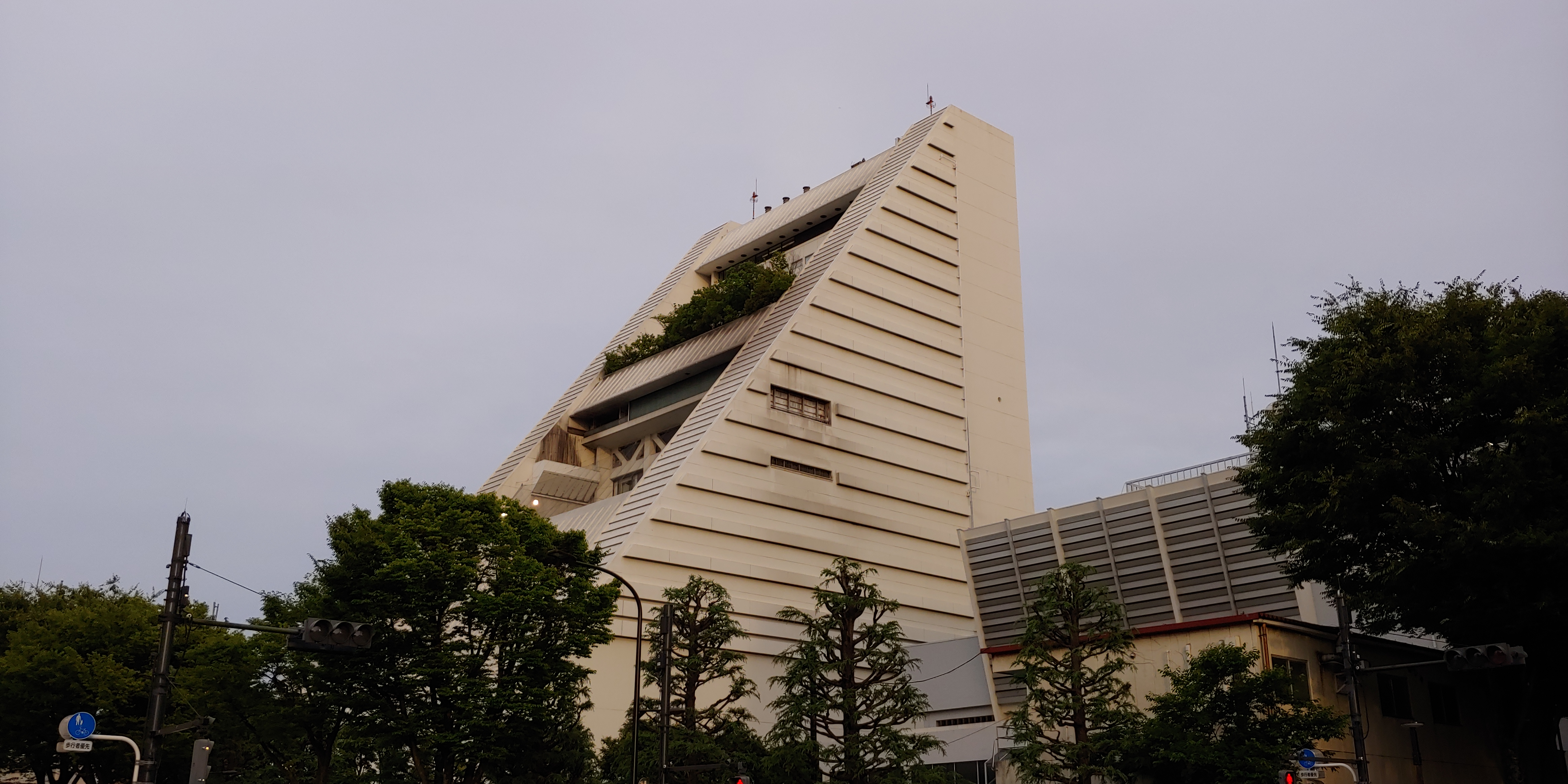
A view of the Nakano Sunplaza building from the southeast.

Leading up to the building's closure and demolition after 50 years, a series of commemorative concerts celebrating the hall's existence and marking its closure, entitled Sayonara Nakano Sun Plaza Ongakusai, and featuring artists such as Flumpool, Ziyoou-Vachi, Reol and Tatsurou Yamashita, was held between May 1 and July 2 of 2023. Richard Koyama-Daniels, writing for Tokyo Weekender, contextualized the loss of a "much-loved municipal landmark" by labeling the replacing of "culturally significant" buildings in the city, such as the Sunplaza, to be "a casualty of capitalism".
