= The Sweetest Taboo =

Single by Sade

from the album Promise
- B-side: "You're Not the Man"
- Released: 4 October 1985
- Genre: Quiet storm; soft rock; jazz
- Length: 4:37
- Label: Epic
- Composers: Sade Adu; Martin Ditcham
- Lyricist: Sade Adu
- Producer: Robin Millar

Sade singles chronology
"Hang On to Your Love" (1984)	"The Sweetest Taboo" (1985)	"Is It a Crime?" (1985)

Music video
- "The Sweetest Taboo" on YouTube

"The Sweetest Taboo" is a song by English band Sade from their second studio album, Promise (1985). It was released in October 1985 as the album's lead single. While the song peaked at number 31 on the UK Singles Chart, it fared considerably better in the United States, where it reached number five on the Billboard Hot 100 in March 1986, remaining in the top 40 for 13 weeks. It also became the band's second consecutive number-one single on the Billboard Adult Contemporary chart, following "Smooth Operator".

== Music video ==
The music video for the song, directed by Brian Ward, features the band playing in a loft space in New York City while Sade reflects on the man in her life, interspersed with desert scenes showing their time together. The desert scenes were filmed in Andalusia, Spain, as was "Never as Good as the First Time" also from the album Promise. The storyline was continued in the video to follow-up single "Is It a Crime?".

== Reception ==
Tanya Rena Jefferson of AXS stated, "The group allows the song to shine with its mellow and uptempo flavor. Sade sings proudly and boldly about how she is given love which brings out the best in her. The quiet storm vibe allows one to stand and groove dance to the soulful peaceful sound of the song."

== Track listings ==
7-inch single (UK and Portugal)

1. "The Sweetest Taboo" – 4:25
2. "You're Not the Man" – 5:20

7-inch single (US, Canada, Australia, New Zealand and select European countries)

1. "The Sweetest Taboo" – 4:24
2. "You're Not the Man" – 5:09

12-inch single (UK, Australia and Japan)

1. "The Sweetest Taboo" (extended version) – 5:30
2. "You're Not the Man" – 5:20

12-inch single (select European countries)

1. "The Sweetest Taboo" (extended version) – 5:27
2. "You're Not the Man" – 5:09

== Charts ==
=== Weekly charts ===
Weekly chart performance for "The Sweetest Taboo"
Chart (1985–1986)	Peak position
Argentina (CAPIF)	2
Australia (Kent Music Report)	65
Austria (Ö3 Austria Top 40)	24
Belgium (Ultratop 50 Flanders)	10
Canada Top Singles (RPM)	12
Canada Adult Contemporary (RPM)	1
Europe (European Top 100 Singles)	12
Finland (Suomen virallinen lista)	9
France (SNEP)	30
Ireland (IRMA)	11
Italy (Musica e dischi)	12
Netherlands (Dutch Top 40)	14
Netherlands (Single Top 100)	12
New Zealand (Recorded Music NZ)	11
Switzerland (Schweizer Hitparade)	14
UK Singles (Official Charts)	31
US Billboard Hot 100	5
US Adult Contemporary (Billboard)	1
US Hot R&B/Hip-Hop Songs (Billboard)	3
US Cash Box Top 100 Singles	8
US Top 100 Black Contemporary Singles (Cash Box)	1
West Germany (GfK)	28

=== Year-end charts ===
Year-end chart performance for "The Sweetest Taboo"
Chart (1986)	Position
US Billboard Hot 100	55
US Adult Contemporary (Billboard)	16
US Hot R&B/Hip-Hop Songs (Billboard)	22
US Cash Box Top 100 Singles	68
US Top 100 Black Contemporary Singles (Cash Box)	7

== See also ==
- List of number-one adult contemporary singles of 1986 (U.S.)
