= Diamond Life =

Studio album by Sade
- Released: 16 July 1984
- Recorded: October–November 1983
- Studio: Power Plant (London)
- Genres: Smooth soul; sophisti-pop; quiet storm; smooth jazz
- Length: 44:31
- Label: Epic
- Producer: Robin Millar

Sade chronology
Diamond Life (1984)	Promise (1985)

Singles from Diamond Life
- 1. "Your Love Is King" Released: January 1984; 2. "When Am I Going to Make a Living" Released: May 1984; 3. "Smooth Operator" Released: August 1984; 4. "Hang On to Your Love" Released: September 1984 (US)

Diamond Life is the debut studio album by English band Sade, released in the United Kingdom on 16 July 1984 by Epic Records and in the United States on 27 February 1985 by Portrait Records. After studying fashion design, and later modelling, Sade Adu began backup-singing with British band Pride. During this time, Adu and three of the original members of Pride—Paul Anthony Cook, Paul Denman, and Stuart Matthewman—left the group to form their own band called Sade. After various demo recordings and performances, Sade received interest from record labels and signed to Epic.

Recording for the album began in 1983 at Power Plant Studios in London and took six weeks to complete. The album's content was written by the members of Sade, and the production was handled by Robin Millar. Fifteen songs were recorded. The album contains a variety of musical styles, including soul, jazz, and sophisti-pop, while its lyrics mostly discuss love. The album spawned four singles, including "Your Love Is King" and "Smooth Operator".

Diamond Life received widespread acclaim from music critics, and it was also a commercial success, winning the 1985 Brit Award for Best British Album. The album reached number two on the UK Albums Chart and number five on the US Billboard 200 and has been certified multiplatinum in both countries. Diamond Life sold over 10 million copies worldwide, becoming one of the top-selling debut recordings of the era and the best-selling debut album by a British female vocalist.

== Background and recording ==
After studying fashion design, and later modelling briefly, Sade Adu began singing backup vocals for the British band Pride. During this time, she formed a songwriting partnership with Pride's guitarist and saxophonist Stuart Matthewman; together, backed by Pride's rhythm section of drummer Paul Anthony Cook and bassist Paul Denman, they began performing their own sets at Pride gigs. Adu's solo performances of the song "Smooth Operator" attracted the attention of record companies, and in 1983, Adu, Matthewman, Cook, and Denman split from Pride to form the band Sade. In May 1983, Sade performed for the first time in the United States, at the Danceteria club in New York City. On 18 October 1983, Adu signed with Epic Records, while the rest of the band signed to her as contractors in 1984.

Prior to signing their record deal, Sade recorded Diamond Life in six weeks. It was recorded at Power Plant Studios in London. After cutting the proposed singles "Smooth Operator" and "Your Love Is King", the first album track recorded was "Sally", a song about the Salvation Army. The band worked collectively on the album's musical direction, rehearsing each song in detail and then recording it. Adu started writing "When Am I Going to Make a Living" on the back of a cleaning ticket after she picked her clothes up from the cleaners. She had no money and she wrote down the song's title.

Producer Robin Millar met the band in 1983, when the band members had never worked in a professional studio and only had demo recordings from the BBC studios and EMI publishing studios. Millar booked a week's worth of studio time and later noted that the limitations of recording before computers had an impact upon the sound: "We used a real piano and a Fender Rhodes piano, painstakingly synching them up." They recorded 15 songs, all written by Adu and members of the group, except "Smooth Operator", which was written exclusively by Adu and Ray St. John. They also recorded a cover version of "Why Can't We Live Together" (1972) by Timmy Thomas.

For the recording of "Cherry Pie", the band had no mixing desks with automation; each member had the job of putting a bit of echo or delay, or changing a level. Millar would then edit between the different mixes. Speaking about this, Matthewman said, "Very often, we would have six people at the mixing desk at the same time."

== Composition ==
Lyrically, Diamond Life revolves around themes of love, discussing both the positives and the negatives of relationships. The music features jazzy textures built over prominent basslines, smooth drums, and subtle guitar. The album also features heavy use of brass instruments and keyboards. Writing for AllMusic, Ron Wynn noted the album's "slick production and quasi-jazz backing" and characterised Adu's singing as "deliberately icy, her delivery and voice aloof, deadpan, and cold".

In a contemporary review, Stephen Holden of The New York Times said Diamond Life "eschews the synthesizers that dominate British pop to make music that resembles a cross between the rock-jazz of Steely Dan and the West Indian-flavored folk-pop of Joan Armatrading. Smoldering Brazilian rhythms blend with terse pop-soul melodies and jazzy harmonies to create a sultry, timeless nightclub ambiance." Rolling Stone's Danyel Smith called it soul music with "self-possessed sophistication", and described Adu's vocal as "thick and rich". Paul Lester of BBC Music stated that Diamond Life exemplified the "mellifluous" quiet storm style of R&B.

The album opens with the single "Smooth Operator", which combines elements of rhythm and blues, jazz, adult contemporary music, pop, and dance music. "Your Love Is King" is a smooth ballad that contains a saxophone solo performed by Stuart Matthewman. The album closes with a cover version of Timmy Thomas' 1972 song "Why Can't We Live Together".

== Promotion and release ==
"Your Love Is King" was released as the album's lead single on 25 February 1984. The song was a success in European territories, peaking at number seven on the Irish Singles Chart and number six on the UK Singles Chart. It was less successful in the United States, where it was released in June 1985 as the album's third single, peaking at number 54 on the Billboard Hot 100. "When Am I Going to Make a Living" was released as the album's second single in the UK on 26 May 1984; the single was less successful than its predecessor, charting at number 28 in Ireland and number 36 in the UK. However, the song did fare well elsewhere, peaking at number 12 on the Dutch Top 40.

"Smooth Operator" was released on 15 September 1984 as the album's third single. It peaked at number 19 in the UK, while reaching the top 20 in Austria, Switzerland, France, and Germany. In the US, the song was released in February 1985 and peaked at number five on the Billboard Hot 100 and Billboard's Hot Black Singles chart, as well as topping the Billboard's Adult Contemporary chart. "Hang On to Your Love" was released in September 1984 as the album's fourth single overall and Sade's first US single.

== Critical reception ==
Professional ratings
Review scores
Source	Rating
AllMusic	4.5/5 stars
Number One	4/5
Pitchfork	9.6/10
Record Mirror	4/5 stars
Rolling Stone	5/5 stars
The Rolling Stone Album Guide	4/5 stars
Smash Hits	8 1/2/10
Sounds	5/5 stars
Uncut	4/5 stars
The Village Voice	B

Preceded by two charting singles and extensive coverage of Sade in the British music press, Diamond Life was highly anticipated in the band's native United Kingdom. The album received widespread acclaim and won the 1985 Brit Award for Best British Album. Calling Adu "a true Lady singing the blues", Sounds critic Garry Johnson praised the "smouldering sensuality" of Diamond Life and labelled it "a classic, proving that all the hype about her was, if anything, under-selling her ability." Paul Bursche of Number One said that the album affirmed "the quality of her songs and that wonderful voice", while Dave Rimmer complimented it as "cool yet finger-snappingly sharp" in Smash Hits. In Record Mirror, Dylan Jones considered it a "confirmation of her talents and charms" and particularly commended its polished production, which he said gave the material "an air of black loud compassion". Less impressed was NME reviewer Rachel Wilde, who felt that despite Adu's "undoubted intelligence" and skilful singing on Diamond Life, "at its core, this is a most conventional style of pleasing."

In a contemporary review for The Village Voice, Robert Christgau applauded Sade's "taste, concept, sound", and avoidance of indulgent musicianship, arguing that these qualities enhanced the "humanitarian" themed songs. The range of both Adu's "grainy voice" and "well-meaning songwriting" was questioned by Christgau, who found "Hang On to Your Love" and "Smooth Operator" more "warming" than "seductive" and incapable of sustaining the rest of the album. Lynn Van Matre from the Chicago Tribune deemed the record "casual cocktail-lounge elegance", performed "with far more style than substance". Connie Johnson of the Los Angeles Times said "there's an earthy substance to some of the cuts—not much substance, but enough to draw you back for another listen", while crediting Sade for knowing how to "clamp personal style onto recycled R&B idioms and make it all look invitingly new."

Reviewing Diamond Life in retrospect for BBC Music, Paul Lester credited Adu for her ability to write "songs that were sufficiently soulful and jazzy yet poppy, funky yet easy listening, to appeal to fans of all those genres." Paul Evans called Diamond Life a "victory of attitude" in The Rolling Stone Album Guide (1992), writing that Sade "projects a wised-up sensuality, and the record neither creaks with the revivalism of Harry Connick nor the sterility of Simply Red, to name but two of Sade's neo-cocktail rivals." AllMusic staff writer Andy Kellman noted the subtle "depth of the material" on Diamond Life and said that while the "luster" of its sound and Adu's "deceptively cool vocals" drew in "casual listeners", the album showed Sade to be "soul aesthetes concerned with more than creating a mood and projecting glamour."

Diamond Life reached number two on the UK Albums Chart and was certified quadruple platinum by the British Phonographic Industry (BPI) on 2 March 1987, denoting shipments in excess of 1.2 million copies in the United Kingdom. In the United States, it peaked at number five on the Billboard 200, and on 2 February 1995, it was certified quadruple platinum by the Recording Industry Association of America for shipments in excess of four million copies. Additionally, the album topped the charts in Austria, France, Germany, the Netherlands, New Zealand, and Switzerland. By May 1985, Diamond Life had sales of over one million copies in the United Kingdom, and four million copies sold worldwide. As of November 1997, worldwide sales stand at 10 million copies.

== Legacy ==
Sade have been credited as being influential to neo soul. In a retrospective piece for Pitchfork, Clover Hope wrote that Diamond Life "became a prototype for a generation of singers who favored naked elegance", including later R&B acts such as D'Angelo, Jill Scott, and Alicia Keys. Sade achieved success in the 1980s with music that featured a sophisti-pop style, incorporating elements of soul, pop, smooth jazz, and quiet storm. Lester credited the album with giving quiet storm music a "wide, even international audience". The band were part of a new wave of British R&B-oriented artists during the late 1980s and early 1990s that also included Soul II Soul, Caron Wheeler, the Brand New Heavies, Simply Red, Jamiroquai, and Lisa Stansfield. AllMusic's Alex Henderson wrote, "Many of the British artists who emerged during that period had a neo-soul outlook and were able to blend influences from different eras."

Diamond Life was among 10 albums nominated for British Album of 30 Years at the 2010 Brit Awards, losing to (What's the Story) Morning Glory? by Oasis. The music video for "Smooth Operator", directed by Julien Temple, was nominated for two MTV Video Music Awards in 1985, Best Female Video and Best New Artist. Diamond Life was voted the 14th best album of 1985 in the Pazz & Jop, an annual poll of American critics, published by The Village Voice; "Smooth Operator" was voted 25th in the singles poll. Pitchfork placed the album at number 10 on its list of "The 200 Best Albums of the 1980s". In 2020, Rolling Stone ranked the album number 200 on its list of "The 500 Greatest Albums of All Time", and, in 2022, number 66 on its list of the "100 Best Debut Albums of All Time".

The album made an appearance in the 2004 horror comedy film Shaun of the Dead, where it was described by main character Shaun (Simon Pegg) as being the favourite album of his now ex-girlfriend Liz, only for his best friend Ed (Nick Frost) to use it as a weapon against the zombies.

== Track listing ==
All tracks are written by Sade Adu and Stuart Matthewman, except where noted.

CD and LP
No.	Title	Writer(s)	Length
1.	"Smooth Operator"	Adu; Ray St. John	4:58
2.	"Your Love Is King"		3:41
3.	"Hang On to Your Love"		5:55
4.	"Frankie's First Affair"		4:39
5.	"When Am I Going to Make a Living"		3:27
6.	"Cherry Pie"	Adu; Matthewman; Andrew Hale; Paul Denman	6:20
7.	"Sally"		5:23
8.	"I Will Be Your Friend"		4:45
9.	"Why Can't We Live Together"	Timmy Thomas	5:28
Total length:			44:31

Some cassette editions, like the initial US and Canadian editions, use the above standard track listing. Others used the track listing below, which included "Smooth Operator" / "Snake Bite" and "Love Affair with Life" from the single for "Your Love Is King".

Cassette – side one
No.	Title	Writer(s)	Length
1.	"Smooth Operator" / "Snake Bite"	Adu; St. John / Matthewman; Hale; Denman	7:28
2.	"Your Love Is King"		3:41
3.	"Hang On to Your Love"		5:55
4.	"Frankie's First Affair"		4:39
5.	"When Am I Going to Make a Living"		3:27

Cassette – side two
No.	Title	Writer(s)	Length
6.	"Cherry Pie"	Adu; Matthewman; Hale; Denman	6:20
7.	"Sally"		5:23
8.	"I Will Be Your Friend"		4:45
9.	"Why Can't We Live Together"	Thomas	5:28
10.	"Love Affair with Life"	Adu; St. John	4:35
Total length:			51:36

== Personnel ==
Credits adapted from the liner notes of Diamond Life.

=== Sade ===
- Sade Adu – vocals
- Stuart Matthewman – saxophone, guitar
- Andrew Hale – keyboards
- Paul S. Denman – bass

=== Additional musicians ===
- Dave Early – drums, percussion
- Martin Ditcham – percussion
- Paul Cooke – drums
- Terry Bailey – trumpet
- Gordon Matthewman – trumpet

=== Technical ===
- Robin Millar – production
- Mike Pela – production engineering
- Ben Rogan – engineering

=== Artwork ===
- Chris Roberts – photos
- Graham Smith – sleeve design

== Charts ==
=== Weekly charts ===
Weekly chart performance for Diamond Life
Chart (1984–1985)	Peak position
Australian Albums (Kent Music Report)	6
Austrian Albums (Ö3 Austria)	1
Canada Top Albums/CDs (RPM)	7
Dutch Albums (Album Top 100)	1
European Albums (Eurotipsheet)	1
Finnish Albums (Suomen virallinen lista)	3
French Albums (IFOP)	1
German Albums (Offizielle Top 100)	1
Italian Albums (Musica e dischi)	2
New Zealand Albums (RMNZ)	1
Norwegian Albums (VG-lista)	20
Swedish Albums (Sverigetopplistan)	18
Swiss Albums (Schweizer Hitparade)	1
UK Albums (Official Charts)	2
US Billboard 200	5
US Top Jazz Albums (Billboard)	5
US Top R&B/Hip-Hop Albums (Billboard)	3

2024–2026 weekly chart performance for Diamond Life
Chart (2024–2026)	Peak position
Belgian Albums (Ultratop Flanders)	193
Greek Albums (IFPI)	59
Hungarian Physical Albums (MAHASZ)	37
Portuguese Albums (AFP)	74

=== Year-end charts ===
1984 year-end chart performance for Diamond Life
Chart (1984)	Position
Australian Albums (Kent Music Report)	60
Austrian Albums (Ö3 Austria)	11
Dutch Albums (Album Top 100)	2
German Albums (Offizielle Top 100)	13
New Zealand Albums (RMNZ)	15
Swiss Albums (Schweizer Hitparade)	10
UK Albums (Gallup)	7

1985 year-end chart performance for Diamond Life
Chart (1985)	Position
Australian Albums (Kent Music Report)	32
Austrian Albums (Ö3 Austria)	10
Canada Top Albums/CDs (RPM)	23
Dutch Albums (Album Top 100)	4
German Albums (Offizielle Top 100)	10
New Zealand Albums (RMNZ)	30
Swiss Albums (Schweizer Hitparade)	24
UK Albums (Gallup)	19
US Billboard 200	24
US Top Jazz Albums (Billboard)	14
US Top R&B/Hip-Hop Albums (Billboard)	12

1986 year-end chart performance for Diamond Life
Chart (1986)	Position
Australian Albums (Kent Music Report)	100
Dutch Albums (Album Top 100)	60
US Billboard 200	61
US Top Jazz Albums (Billboard)	35

== Certifications and sales ==
Certifications and sales for Diamond Life
Region	Certification	Certified units/sales
Australia (ARIA)	4× Platinum	280,000^{^}
Brazil	—	300,000
Canada (Music Canada)	2× Platinum	200,000^{^}
France (SNEP)	2× Platinum	700,000
Germany (BVMI)	Platinum	850,000
Japan	—	150,000
Netherlands (NVPI)	Platinum	100,000^{^}
New Zealand (RMNZ)	Platinum	15,000^{^}
New Zealand (RMNZ) Reissue	Gold	7,500^{‡}
Spain (Promusicae)	Gold	50,000^{^}
Switzerland (IFPI Switzerland)	2× Platinum	100,000^{^}
United Kingdom (BPI)	4× Platinum	1,200,000^{^}
United States (RIAA)	4× Platinum	4,000,000^{^}
United States (RIAA) Video	Gold	50,000^{^}
Summaries
Europe	—	4,000,000
Worldwide	—	10,000,000 – 12,000,000
^{^} Shipments figures based on certification alone.^{‡} Sales+streaming figures based on certification alone.

== See also ==
- List of European number-one hits of 1985
