= Promise (Sade album) =

Studio album by Sade
- Released: 4 November 1985
- Recorded: February–August 1985
- Studios: Power Plant (London); Miraval (Le Val, France)
- Genres: Soul; jazz; pop
- Length: 54:10
- Label: Epic
- Producers: Robin Millar; Mike Pela; Ben Rogan; Sade

Sade chronology
Diamond Life (1984)	Promise (1985)	Stronger Than Pride (1988)

Singles from Promise
- 1. "The Sweetest Taboo" Released: October 1985; 2. "Is It a Crime?" Released: December 1985; 3. "Never as Good as the First Time" Released: March 1986

Promise is the second studio album by English band Sade, released in the United Kingdom on 4 November 1985 by Epic Records and in the United States on 15 November 1985 by Portrait Records. Recording for the album began in February and lasted until August 1985. The band co-produced the album with the same team of producers they worked with on their debut album, Diamond Life, including Robin Millar, Mike Pela and Ben Rogan. The album's title comes from a letter from Sade Adu's father where he refers to the "promise of hope" to recover from cancer.

The album was a commercial success, peaking at number one on both the UK Albums Chart and the US Billboard 200, becoming the band's first album to top both charts. It also reached number one in Finland, the Netherlands and Switzerland, and the top five in numerous countries, including Canada, Germany and New Zealand. The album spawned three singles, including "The Sweetest Taboo", which became a success worldwide.

== Background ==
After studying fashion design, and later modeling briefly, Adu sang backup with British band Pride. During this time she formed a writing partnership with Pride's guitarist and saxophonist, Stuart Matthewman; together, backed by Pride's rhythm section, they began doing their own sets at Pride gigs. In 1983, Adu and Matthewman split from Pride along with keyboardist Andrew Hale, bassist Paul Denman, and drummer Paul Cooke and formed Sade; later that year they got a record deal. Afterwards, Sade released their debut album, Diamond Life, in 1984, which became a success in the United Kingdom and later became a success in the United States following the release of its single "Smooth Operator". Diamond Life has sold over six million copies worldwide, becoming one of the top-selling debut album of the 1980s and the best-selling debut ever by a British female vocalist.

== Recording ==
Between February and August 1985, Sade enlisted the same team of producers they worked with on Diamond Life. The band co-produced Promise with Robin Millar, Mike Pela, and Ben Rogan, the latter of which played a less central role in the production. Some of the album's sessions took place during a two-week sojourn in Provence, utilising an SSL E-series console housed at the barn-shaped, concrete-built Studio Miraval. However, the majority of the album was recorded at Power Plant Studios in London, where the project commenced in February 1985 and concluded seven months later, with the mix being done in the Gallery (Studio Three) located on the top floor, with its 44-channel Harrison MR3. Studio One is where the production team initially listened to several of the songs in demo form, although Pela was at the Royal Albert Hall when he first heard one of the new tracks. Like their debut album, Promise was recorded live, though it featured the use of technology, sampling drums by way of an AMS with a lock-in feature.

The album's lead single was created at Power Plant's Studio One, where a 30 × 25 × 18-foot live area was complemented by a 36-channel Harrison Series 24 console, UREI 813B main monitors and a 24-track Studer A820 recorder running Ampex tape at 30ips. Pela explained the process saying, "We had UREI monitors in all of the rooms so that there was some continuity, and we also had Acoustic Research AR18Ss, which we discovered at that studio and which I've still got a pair of. They were like hi-fi speakers, they only cost about 80 quid, and once we'd started using them the company stopped making them. They were really nice and natural-sounding, not designed to carry super-low heavy frequencies, but absolutely fine."

== Release and promotion ==
The album spawned three singles: "Is It a Crime?", "Never as Good as the First Time" and "The Sweetest Taboo", the latter of which was released as the album's lead single and spent six months on the US Billboard Hot 100. "The Sweetest Taboo" peaked at number five on the US Billboard Hot 100, number one on the US Adult Contemporary chart and number three on the US Hot R&B/Hip-Hop Songs. The second single "Never as Good as the First Time" was released in 1986, reaching number six on the Adult Contemporary chart, number 18 on the Hot Dance Music/Maxi-Singles Sales chart, number eight on the Hot R&B/Hip-Hop Songs chart and number 20 on the US Billboard Hot 100.

== Critical reception ==
Professional ratings
Review scores
Source	Rating
AllMusic	4/5 stars
Encyclopedia of Popular Music	4/5 stars
Pitchfork	9.0/10
The Rolling Stone Album Guide	3.5/5 stars
The Village Voice	B

In a contemporary review for Rolling Stone, Anthony DeCurtis felt that "the careful elegance of the production and instrumental settings seems little more than a strategy to conceal the limitations of Sade's vocal range and skills as a song stylist". The Village Voice's Robert Christgau commented, "Even when it's this sumptuous, there's a problem with aural wallpaper—once you start paying attention to it, it's not wallpaper anymore, it's pictures on the wall. And while as a wallpaper these pictures may be something, they can't compete with the ones you've hung up special." Spin said, "Sade is a torch singer without the torch. Her voice has no blood, no guts, and no soul."

Ron Wynn of AllMusic was more positive in his retrospective review, stating that the album was superior to the band's debut and describing Sade as the "personification of cool, laid-back singing", despite "seldom extending or embellishing lyrics, registering emotion, or projecting her voice." In a retrospective review for Pitchfork, Naima Cochrane called Promise "lush and unhurried" and "the ideal second album, firmly establishing the Sade template without retreading the same material of the band's debut." Cochrane felt that "You can wrap yourself up in the music and Adu's soft-touch tone, recall or lament life and love through the lyrics, or fully immerse yourself with both."

== Commercial performance ==
Promise became the band's first and only album to reach number one on the UK Albums Chart, entering at that position and staying there for two weeks. Within just two weeks of release, it was certified Platinum by the BPI, and double Platinum in less than three months. It also became the band's first album to reach number one on the US Billboard 200, spending two weeks at the top position. By September 1988, Promise had sold one million copies in the United States, and on 23 July 1997, it was certified quadruple platinum by the Recording Industry Association of America (RIAA) for shipments in excess of four million copies. When Sade's sixth studio album, Soldier of Love, topped the Top R&B/Hip-Hop Albums chart in 2010, the group set the record for the longest gap between number-one albums on the chart (Promise and Soldier of Love were separated by 23 years, 10 months and 2 weeks).

== Track listing ==
All lyrics are written by Sade Adu, except "Punch Drunk".

No.	Title	Music	Producer(s)	Length
1.	"Is It a Crime?"	Adu; Stuart Matthewman; Andrew Hale	Robin Millar	6:20
2.	"The Sweetest Taboo"	Adu; Martin Ditcham	Millar	4:37
3.	"War of the Hearts"	Adu; Matthewman	Millar	6:47
4.	"You're Not the Man"	Adu; Matthewman	Millar; Ben Rogan; Sade	5:10
5.	"Jezebel"	Adu; Matthewman	Millar	5:29
6.	"Mr Wrong"	Adu; Matthewman; Paul Denman; Hale	Millar	2:51
7.	"Punch Drunk"	Hale	Millar	5:25
8.	"Never as Good as the First Time"	Adu; Matthewman	Millar; Rogan; Mike Pela; Sade	5:00
9.	"Fear"	Adu; Matthewman	Millar	4:09
10.	"Tar Baby"	Adu; Matthewman	Millar	3:58
11.	"Maureen"	Adu; Hale; Denman	Rogan; Sade	4:20
Total length:				54:10

=== Notes ===
- "You're Not the Man" and "Punch Drunk" are not included on the LP version of the album.

== Personnel ==
Credits adapted from the liner notes of Promise.

=== Sade ===
- Sade Adu – vocals
- Stuart Matthewman – saxophone, guitar
- Paul S. Denman – bass guitar
- Andrew Hale – keyboards
- Sade – arrangements

=== Additional musicians ===
- Dave Early – drums, percussion
- Martin Ditcham – percussion
- Terry Bailey – trumpet
- Pete Beachill – trombone
- Jake Jacas – vocals (tracks 8, 11)
- Carlos Bonell – guitar (track 9)
- Nick Ingman – string arrangements (tracks 9, 10)

=== Technical ===
- Robin Millar – production (tracks 1–10)
- Ben Rogan – production (tracks 4, 8, 11)
- Sade – production (tracks 4, 8, 11)
- Mike Pela – production (track 8); mixing (track 11); production engineering (all tracks)

=== Artwork ===
- Toshi Yajima – photography
- Graham Smith – sleeve design

== Charts ==
=== Weekly charts ===
1985–1986 weekly chart performance for Promise
Chart (1985–1986)	Peak position
Argentinian Albums (CAPIF)	2
Australian Albums (Kent Music Report)	9
Austrian Albums (Ö3 Austria)	6
Canada Top Albums/CDs (RPM)	3
Dutch Albums (Album Top 100)	1
European Albums (Music & Media)	1
Finnish Albums (Suomen virallinen lista)	1
French Albums (IFOP)	3
German Albums (Offizielle Top 100)	2
Italian Albums (Musica e dischi)	1
New Zealand Albums (RMNZ)	3
Norwegian Albums (VG-lista)	6
Swedish Albums (Sverigetopplistan)	4
Swiss Albums (Schweizer Hitparade)	1
UK Albums (Official Charts)	1
US Billboard 200	1
US Top Jazz Albums (Billboard)	4
US Top R&B/Hip-Hop Albums (Billboard)	1

2024–2026 weekly chart performance for Promise
Chart (2024–2026)	Peak position
Greek Albums (IFPI)	24
Portuguese Albums (AFP)	117
US Top Contemporary Jazz Albums (Billboard)	6

=== Year-end charts ===
1985 year-end chart performance for Promise
Chart (1985)	Position
Dutch Albums (Album Top 100)	20
European Albums (Music & Media)	4
Norwegian Autumn Period Albums (VG-lista)	12
UK Albums (Gallup)	17

1986 year-end chart performance for Promise
Chart (1986)	Position
Australian Albums (Kent Music Report)	18
Austrian Albums (Ö3 Austria)	20
Canada Top Albums/CDs (RPM)	13
Dutch Albums (Album Top 100)	9
European Albums (Music & Media)	6
German Albums (Offizielle Top 100)	10
Swiss Albums (Schweizer Hitparade)	13
UK Albums (Gallup)	76
US Billboard 200	8
US Top Jazz Albums (Billboard)	10
US Top R&B/Hip-Hop Albums (Billboard)	3

== Certifications and sales ==
Certifications and sales for Promise
Region	Certification	Certified units/sales
Australia (ARIA)	Platinum	70,000^{^}
Belgium (BRMA)	Platinum	75,000
Canada (Music Canada)	2× Platinum	200,000^{^}
Finland (Musiikkituottajat)	Platinum	58,935
France (SNEP)	2× Platinum	600,000^{*}
Germany (BVMI)	Platinum	570,000
Japan	—	200,000
New Zealand (RMNZ)	Platinum	15,000^{^}
United Kingdom (BPI)	2× Platinum	600,000^{^}
United States (RIAA)	4× Platinum	4,500,000
Summaries
Worldwide	—	9,300,000
^{*} Sales figures based on certification alone.^{^} Shipments figures based on certification alone.

== Release history ==
Format	Label	Date	Ref.
LP	Epic	1985	
CD	Universal Music	1985	
Cassette	Portrait	1985	
CD	Sony Music Distribution	1990	
CD	BMG / Sony Music Entertainment	2000	
LP	Epic	2000	
MiniDisc	Epic	2000	

== See also ==
- List of Billboard 200 number-one albums of 1986
- List of Billboard number-one R&B albums of 1986
- List of European number-one hits of 1985
- List of European number-one hits of 1986
- List of UK Albums Chart number ones of the 1980s
