= Hang On to Your Love =

- German and Dutch cover

Single by Sade

from the album Diamond Life
- B-side: "Should I Love You"; "Why Can't We Live Together"; "Cherry Pie"
- Released: September 1984 (US)
- Recorded: 1983–1984
- Studio: Power Plant, London
- Genre: R&B; smooth jazz; lounge; funk
- Length: 5:54 (album version); 3:58 (single version)
- Label: Epic
- Songwriters: Sade Adu; Stuart Matthewman
- Producer: Robin Millar

Sade singles chronology
"Smooth Operator" (1984)	"Hang On to Your Love" (1984)	"The Sweetest Taboo" (1985)

Alternative cover
- North American cover

Music video
- "Hang On to Your Love" on YouTube

"Hang On to Your Love" is a song by English band Sade from their debut studio album, Diamond Life (1984). It was written by Sade Adu and Stuart Matthewman, and produced by Robin Millar. It was released in September 1984 as the album's first North American single and fourth single overall.

== Reception ==
Frank Guan of Vulture commented that "Sade's first introduction to an American audience came with this song: powered by a heavy, driving bassline and some of Sade's best advice-centered lyrics, 'Hang On' ensured that her stateside fans would do just that."

== Music video ==
The music video for "Hang On to Your Love" was directed by Brian Ward and stars actors Alex Norton and Gerard Kelly.

== Track listings ==
German and Dutch 7-inch single

1. "Hang On to Your Love" (Radio Edit) – 3:58
2. "Should I Love You" – 3:50

Dutch 7-inch maxi single (US Remix)

1. "Hang On to Your Love" (US Remix) – 5:13
2. B.
  1. "Should I Love You" – 3:50
  2. "Why Can't We Live Together" – 5:28

US and Canadian 7-inch single

1. "Hang On to Your Love" – 4:21
2. "Cherry Pie" – 4:25

US 12-inch single

1. "Hang On to Your Love" (Album Version) – 5:54
2. "Hang On to Your Love" (7" Version) – 4:21

== Charts ==
=== Weekly charts ===
Weekly chart performance for "Hang On to Your Love"
Chart (1985)	Peak position
Australia (Kent Music Report)	68
Netherlands (Dutch Top 40)	28
Netherlands (Single Top 100)	18
New Zealand (Recorded Music NZ)	20
US Bubbling Under Hot 100 Singles (Billboard)	2
US Dance Club Songs (Billboard)	5
US Dance Singles Sales (Billboard)	6
US Hot R&B/Hip-Hop Songs (Billboard)	14
US Top 100 Black Contemporary Singles (Cash Box)	12

=== Year-end charts ===
Year-end chart performance for "Hang On to Your Love"
Chart (1985)	Position
US Dance Club Songs (Billboard)	13
