= When Am I Going to Make a Living =

Single by Sade

from the album Diamond Life
- B-side: "Why Can't We Live Together"; "Should I Love You"
- Released: 14 May 1984
- Recorded: 1983–1984
- Studio: Power Plant, London
- Genre: Soul
- Length: 3:27
- Label: Epic
- Songwriters: Sade Adu; Stuart Matthewman
- Producer: Robin Millar

Sade singles chronology
"Your Love Is King" (1984)	"When Am I Going to Make a Living" (1984)	"Smooth Operator" (1984)

Music video
- "When Am I Going to Make a Living" on YouTube

"When Am I Going to Make a Living" is a song by English band Sade from their debut studio album, Diamond Life (1984). It was released on 14 May 1984 as the album's second single. It was written by Sade Adu & Stuart Matthewman, and produced by Robin Millar.

== Music video ==
The music video was directed by Stuart Orme, and takes place with Sade in Power Plant, London.

== Reception ==
Upon its release, Smash Hits reviewer Dave Rimmer named the song "A classic" and described it as a "cheering song of optimism in the face of hardship with a chorus - "We're hungry but we won't give in" - that should be sung from the rooftops."

Retrospectively, Frank Guan of Vulture commented, "Few songs capture the sense of living amidst dealers and liars in a precarious economy better than this early single, nor better express the cheeky optimism that things will get better once we both take individual responsibility and see ourselves collectively. Written during the Thatcher years, it's only gained in relevance in the three decades since."

== Track listings ==
- UK 7-inch single

A. "When Am I Going to Make a Living"
B. "Should I Love You"

- UK 12-inch maxi single

A. "When Am I Going to Make a Living"
B1. "Why Can't We Live Together"
B2. "Should I Love You"

== Charts ==
Chart performance for "When Am I Going to Make a Living"
Chart (1984)	Peak position
Belgium (Ultratop 50 Flanders)	29
Ireland (IRMA)	28
Netherlands (Dutch Top 40)	12
Netherlands (Single Top 100)	12
UK Singles (OCC)	36
