= Connor Leimer =

American singer-songwriter

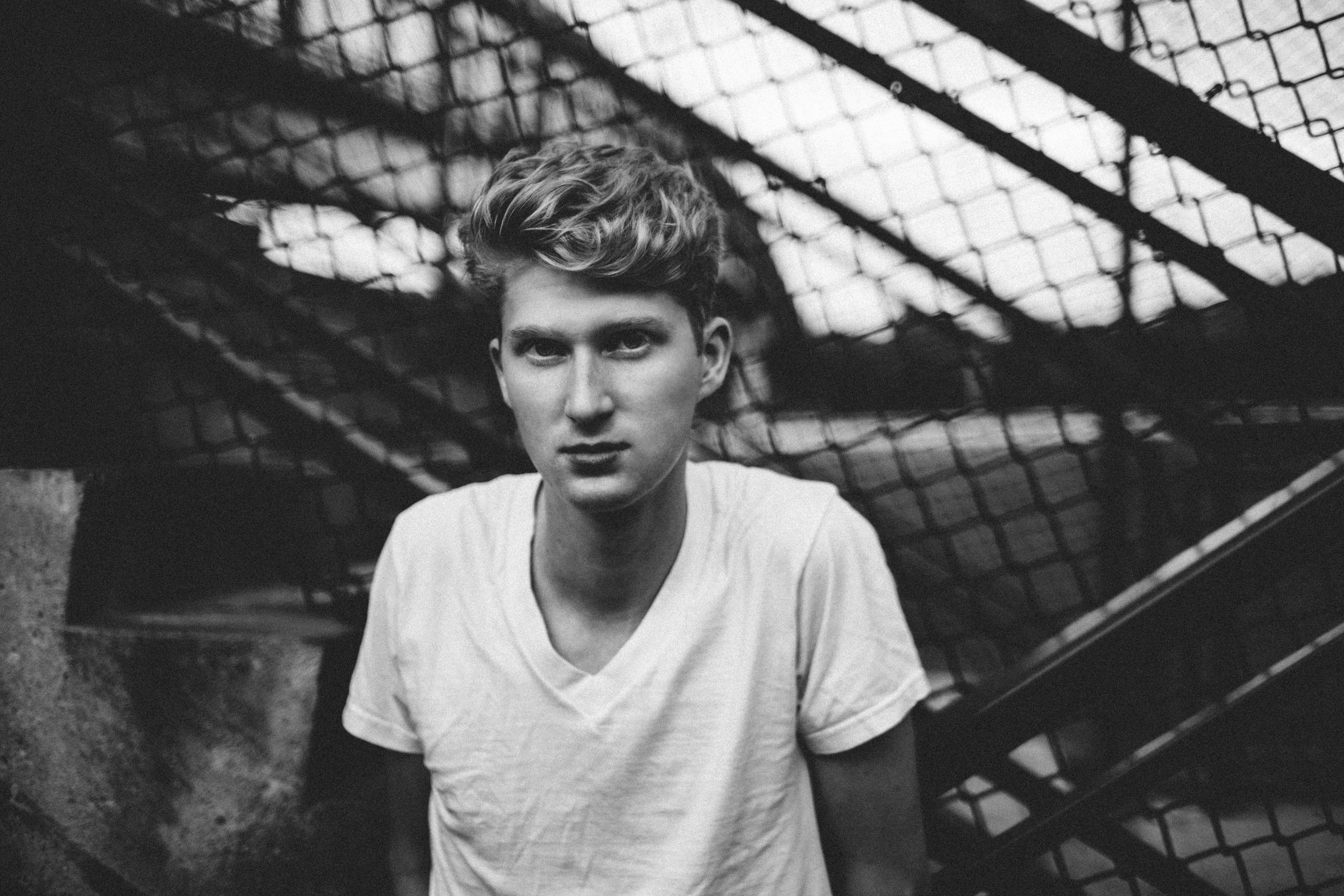

Background information
- Born: Connor Leimer; July 1996 (age 30); Kansas City, MO
- Genres: Rock; Indie rock Folk
- Occupation: Singer/songwriter
- Instruments: Vocals, guitar, piano, bass, drums
- Years active: 2012–present
- Label: Independent
- Website: www.connorleimer.com

Connor Leimer (born July 1996) is a New York-based musician, songwriter and record-maker. Born in Kansas City and raised on the DIY music scene, Connor’s love for music began at age 7 in his weekly drum lessons with his Brazilian drum instructor Luiz Orsano. It was there that Connor discovered his natural sense of rhythm that uniquely informed his songwriting and by 13 he was penning a new song each week on his dad’s 70’s Guild acoustic guitar. Connor’s talents quickly grabbed the attention of the music industry with the release of his debut album “Postcard” in 2015. By 19, Connor graced the cover of Visual Tales Magazine shot by legendary Vogue photographer Arthur Elgort, performed at The Recording Academy’s Grammy Museum at L.A. Live and cut his teeth in the studio with Nashville’s top session players.

By 21, Connor independently released his celebrated single ‘Brooklyn’ produced by Grammy-Award winning producer Matt Rollings, mixed by Michael Brauer at Electric Lady Studios and premiered with a music video directed by auteur Warren Elgort, starring Victoria Lee. At 22, after a chance meeting with folk/pop artist Josh Rouse, the pair collaborated on 2019’s ‘Mouth Words’ EP produced and cowritten by Rouse, one of Connor’s major influences. In 2021, Connor teamed up with East Nashville producer Kyle Dreaden to release ‘Like My Mind’ EP. The collaboration would ultimately lay the ground work for Connor’s highly anticipated full-length album ‘Writing Copies’ LP released in the fall of 2022. The 10 song album was recorded entirely on a Neve 8014 console in five days of back-to-back sessions and was mastered by the legendary Greg Calbi at Sterling Sound.

In 2023, Connor released the 15 song double album “In New York, at 22”, which was definitive for his career – featuring new singles “Little Weight” and “Trap Door” as well as a medley of works all detailing the artist’s first impressions of New York City.

== Discography ==
- 2015 Postcard (album)
- 2022 Writing Copies (album)
- 2023 In New York, at 22 (album)
