= Your Love Is King =

Single by Sade

from the album Diamond Life
- B-side: "Love Affair with Life"
- Released: January 1984
- Recorded: 1983
- Studio: Power Plant (London, England)
- Genre: Soul; smooth jazz; pop; R&B; lounge; bossa nova
- Length: 3:42 (album version); 3:28 (promo version)
- Label: Epic
- Songwriters: Sade Adu; Stuart Matthewman
- Producer: Robin Millar

Sade singles chronology
"Your Love Is King" (1984)	"When Am I Going to Make a Living" (1984)

Music video
- "Your Love Is King" on YouTube

"Your Love Is King" is a song by English band Sade from their debut studio album, Diamond Life (1984). The song was written by Sade Adu and Stuart Matthewman, and produced by Robin Millar. It was the album's lead single in the UK, released in January 1984, and the third single in the US, released there circa June 1985.

The song became the group's highest-charting single on the UK Singles Chart to date, peaking at number 6. In the US, it reached number 54 on the Billboard Hot 100 chart, number 35 on Billboard's Hot Black Singles chart, and number eight on Billboard's Adult Contemporary chart. The B-sides of the 12-inch single were included on cassette versions of Diamond Life, with the extended "Smooth Operator/Snake Bite" replacing the original. The song is performed on the Live Aid concert.

English pop singer Will Young covered the song for the soundtrack to the 2004 film Bridget Jones: The Edge of Reason.

== Composition ==
"Your Love is King" was originally published in the key of A Major in 12/8 time with a tempo of 90 beats per minute. Adu's vocals span from A_{4} to F#_{5}.

The tenor saxophone is played by Stuart Matthewman.

== Reception ==
"Your Love is King" was ranked at number seven on Heavy's list of Top 51 Best Love Songs: The Heavy Power List. Tanya Rena Jefferson of AXS stated, "The jazzy slow swaying song, allows you to feel the smoothness of Sade's voice." Frank Guan of Vulture commented, "There's a special charm to certain early Sade songs where poise and lightness prove compatible with profound commitment, and this song, with its blend of spiritual and physical love, is definitely one of them."

== Track listings ==
- UK, US, and Dutch 7-inch single

A. "Your Love Is King" – 3:39
B. "Love Affair with Life" (recorded live) – 4:35

- UK and Dutch 12-inch maxi single

A1. "Your Love Is King" – 3:58
B1. "Smooth Operator"/"Snake Bite" – 7:28
B2. "Love Affair with Life" (recorded live) – 4:35

== Charts ==
=== Weekly charts ===
Weekly chart performance for "Your Love Is King"
Chart (1984–1985)	Peak position
Australia (Kent Music Report)	64
Belgium (Ultratop 50 Flanders)	38
Canada Adult Contemporary (RPM)	11
Europe (European Top 100 Singles)	30
Ireland (IRMA)	7
Italy (Musica e dischi)	5
New Zealand (Recorded Music NZ)	2
UK Singles (Official Charts)	6
US Billboard Hot 100	54
US Adult Contemporary (Billboard)	8
US Hot R&B/Hip-Hop Songs (Billboard)	35
US Cash Box Top 100 Singles	52
US Top 100 Black Contemporary Singles (Cash Box)	39

=== Year-end charts ===
Year-end chart performance for "Your Love Is King"
Chart (1984)	Position
New Zealand (Recorded Music NZ)	21
UK Singles (Gallup)	97

== Certifications ==
Certifications and sales for "Your Love Is King"
Region	Certification	Certified units/sales
New Zealand (RMNZ)	Gold	15,000^{‡}
Spain (Promusicae)	Gold	30,000^{‡}
United Kingdom (BPI) Sales since 2020	Gold	400,000^{‡}
^{‡} Sales+streaming figures based on certification alone.
