= Never as Good as the First Time =

Single by Sade

from the album Promise
- B-side: "Keep Hanging On"
- Released: 5 March 1986
- Recorded: 1985
- Genre: Pop; funk; R&B
- Length: 5:00 (album version); 3:57 (single version)
- Label: Epic
- Composers: Sade Adu; Stuart Matthewman
- Lyricist: Sade Adu
- Producers: Robin Millar; Ben Rogan; Mike Pela; Sade

Sade singles chronology
"Is It a Crime?" (1986)	"Never as Good as the First Time" (1986)	"Love Is Stronger Than Pride" (1988)

Music video
- "Never as Good as the First Time" on YouTube

"Never as Good as the First Time" is a song by English band Sade from their second studio album, Promise (1985). It was released as the album's second single and contained a vocal intro not included on the original album version, as well as a slightly different vocal mix. The song reached number 8 on the Billboard R&B Singles chart and number 20 on the US Billboard Hot 100.

== Reception ==
Frank Guan of Vulture stated, "Nearly all Sade songs are about commitment and security, but this, an ode to hooking up and living purely in the present, is the exception. The reckless pace matches the lyrical abandon. It's no accident that the music video is mostly just Sade racing a horse across open country, which is so great that it’s tempting to replace the Internet entirely with GIFs of Sade racing a horse across open country."

== Music video ==
The black-and-white music video for "Never as Good as the First Time" features Sade Adu riding a horse through the towns of El Rocío, Almonte, and Huelva in Andalusia, Spain.

== Track listings ==
- 7-inch single

A. "Never as Good as the First Time" (Remix Edit) – 3:57
B. "Keep Hanging On" (Live Instrumental) – 2:59

- US, Canadian and Japanese 7-inch single

A. "Never as Good as the First Time" (Remix Edit) – 3:57
B. "Keep Hanging On" (Live Instrumental) – 2:59

- 12-inch single

A. "Never as Good as the First Time" (Extended Mix) – 5:06
B. "Keep Hanging On" (Live Instrumental) – 2:59

- US, Canadian and Japanese 12-inch single

A. "Never as Good as the First Time" (Extended Remix) – 5:12
B. "Keep Hanging On" (Live Instrumental) – 2:59

== Charts ==
Chart performance for "Never as Good as the First Time"
Chart (1986)	Peak position
Australia (Kent Music Report)	70
Canada Top Singles (RPM)	34
Canada Adult Contemporary (RPM)	6
Ireland (IRMA)	29
Netherlands (Dutch Top 40)	35
Netherlands (Single Top 100)	38
New Zealand (Recorded Music NZ)	31
UK Singles (Official Charts)	89
US Billboard Hot 100	20
US Adult Contemporary (Billboard)	6
US Dance Singles Sales (Billboard)	18
US Hot R&B/Hip-Hop Songs (Billboard)	8
US Cash Box Top 100 Singles	23
US Black Contemporary Singles (Cash Box)	9
West Germany (GfK)	65
