= Is It a Crime (Sade song) =

Single by Sade

from the album Promise
- B-side: "Punch Drunk"; "Wired"
- Released: December 1985
- Recorded: 1985
- Genre: Smooth jazz; soul
- Length: 6:21
- Label: Epic
- Composers: Sade Adu; Andrew Hale; Stuart Matthewman
- Lyricist: Sade Adu
- Producer: Robin Millar

Sade singles chronology
"The Sweetest Taboo" (1985)	"Is It a Crime" (1985)	"Never as Good as the First Time" (1986)

Music video
- "Is It a Crime?" on YouTube

"Is It a Crime" is a song by English band Sade from their second studio album, Promise (1985). It was written by Sade Adu, Andrew Hale and Stuart Matthewman, and produced by Robin Millar. The song was released as the album's second single by Epic Records.

== Music video ==
Directed by Brian Ward, the music promo for the single is the follow-up to the previous video for "The Sweetest Taboo" featuring Sade's former lover in New York City. Whilst Sade sings the song in a loft space, also in New York City, both reminisce how the relationship ended up becoming violent and abusive.

== Critical reception ==
Tanya Rena Jefferson of AXS stated, "'Is It a Crime' is a smooth jazz filled song that fills up your brain with soulful joy. Sade sings in confidence on how she is in love, and she is so in love that she wonders if it is a crime that she loves her lover so. The romantic mellow song has a great tempo that fills your ears with sudden relaxation and ease." Sophie Heawood of The Guardian commented that "Sade's penchant for the epic was fully indulged on this six-and-a-half-minute 1986 single, from its length to its metaphors: her love here is 'wider than Victoria Lake ... taller than the Empire State' – and, unsaid, clearly able to traverse half the globe as well." Frank Guan of Vulture commented, "The alternation between low/slow verse and high/loud chorus is so effective here you wonder if the Pixies hadn't learned a thing or two from this track. There's a kind of subtle but forceful politics in her assertion of the scale of her love: it exceeds all imperial figures." Dave Rimmer of Smash Hits states in a contemporary review, "Can hardly blame old 'shimmering' Sade herself for this," but the song "seems to go on absolutely for ever" and like her other work, "it conjur[es] up ghastly visions of supposedly sophisticated wine bars, young executives with car stereos and trendy parents having dinner parties".

== Track listings ==
- 7-inch single

A. "Is It a Crime" – 6:21
B. "Punch Drunk" – 5:25

- 12-inch single

A1. "Is It a Crime" – 6:21
A2. "Wired" – 3:34
B. "Punch Drunk" – 5:25

== Charts ==
Chart performance for "Is It a Crime"
Chart (1986)	Peak position
Belgium (Ultratop 50 Flanders)	28
Finland (Suomen virallinen lista)	17
France (SNEP)	46
Ireland (IRMA)	21
Netherlands (Dutch Top 40)	32
Netherlands (Single Top 100)	24
Switzerland (Schweizer Hitparade)	30
UK Singles (OCC)	49
US Adult Contemporary (Billboard)	32
US Hot R&B/Hip-Hop Songs (Billboard)	55
US Black Contemporary Singles (Cash Box)	47
West Germany (GfK)	57
