= Smooth Operator =

1984 single by Sade

Single by Sade

from the album Diamond Life
- B-side: "Spirit"; "Red Eye"
- Released: 28 August 1984
- Recorded: 1983
- Studio: Power Plant (London)
- Genre: Quiet storm; sophisti-pop; bossa nova; smooth jazz
- Length: 4:58 (album version); 4:15 (single version)
- Label: Epic
- Songwriters: Sade Adu; Ray St. John
- Producer: Robin Millar

Sade singles chronology
"When Am I Going to Make a Living" (1984)	"Smooth Operator" (1984)	"Hang On to Your Love" (1984)

Music video
- "Smooth Operator" on YouTube
- "Smooth Operator" (12″ version) on YouTube

"Smooth Operator" is a song by English band Sade from their debut studio album, Diamond Life (1984); it was co-written by Sade Adu and Ray St. John and was released as the album's third single in the United Kingdom as a 7-inch single with "Spirit" as its B-side, and as a 12-inch maxi single with "Smooth Operator" and "Red Eye" on side A and "Spirit" on side B. Released on 28 August 1984, it reached number 19 on the UK Singles Chart.

In the United States, "Smooth Operator" was released in February 1985, serving as the album's second US single. The song became Sade's first top-10 entry in the US, peaking at number five on the Billboard Hot 100 for two weeks in May 1985. It spent 13 weeks in the top 40, and also topped the Billboard Adult Contemporary chart for two weeks.

Although "Your Love Is King" remains Sade's highest-peaking single in the UK to date, "Smooth Operator" is the band's breakthrough single on the US charts, and their most successful single internationally.

== Background ==
Ray St. John, who co-wrote "Smooth Operator" with Sade Adu, was a member of Adu's former band, Pride, although he was not a member of the band Sade. The pair co-wrote the song in 1982 while still members of Pride, but did not get around to recording it.

== Composition and lyrics ==
"Smooth Operator" is about a fashionable con man who moves within high social circles. He is popular with women and breaks many hearts. The lyrics "Coast to coast, LA to Chicago, western male / Across the north and south, to Key Largo, love for sale" imply that he also uses women to obtain his income. Also, he clearly does not hold sincere affection for these women, as Adu sings near the end, "his heart is cold".

This song is noted for Adu's spoken recitation in the song's introduction. Some radio edits have omitted the spoken introduction and proceeded with the opening sung line of the title of the album, "Diamond Life". Some radio edits have shortened the instrumental saxophone solo, as well as the first repeat of the lines that come after the chorus portions.

The song's sheet music is in the key of D minor (D dorian for the intro).

== Music video ==
The video to this song reinforces the message. The operator (Michael Feast) is apparently a professional criminal. In one scene, he displays a gun to an interested customer, and in others, he appears to be a pimp. Apparently, he succeeds in evading law enforcement, who have him under surveillance. In the video, the operator cheats on Sade with a waitress of the nightclub (Amanda Pays).

In the extended version of the video, which contains the composition "Red Eye" (the next song on 12-inch single), Sade, cooperating with the police, hides behind the nightclub equipment and sees the criminal return to the club. Then, she bumps into a box, causing a noise, and the criminal chases after her. When the police arrive outside, he tries to escape from them from rooftop to rooftop until he is shot and then falls from a rooftop to his death. The video was directed by Julien Temple, who would later cast Sade in his 1986 film musical Absolute Beginners.

== Reception ==
Tanya Rena Jefferson of AXS stated: "The warm tonal voice of Sade sings about a smooth operator con artist lover boy. 'Smooth Operator' reached number one on the Billboard Adult Contemporary charts in 1985." Sophie Heawood of The Guardian commented: "Arguably the band's signature single, the accuracy with which its suave music, complete with sax solo, conveyed the business-class lifestyle of its subject set the tone for how they would be perceived over their entire career. As a credo, 'We move in space with minimum waste and maximum joy' remains revelatory." Frank Guan of Vulture commented: "Along with an ace lead saxophone and winding bass line, the secret to success for Sade's biggest early hit is hiding in plain sight: the heartless playboy traversing cities and continents in search of pleasure that she narrates serves as an allegory for Global Capitalism, but also for herself: her international range and her voice – every time she croons 'smooth operator', there's a measure of self-reference. Her amoral protagonist's villainy is rendered in such lovely phrases that the listener can't help but be seduced."

== Track listings ==
- UK, US, Dutch, and Australian 7-inch single

A. "Smooth Operator" – 4:15
B. "Spirit" – 5:28

- UK, US, Canadian, Dutch, and Japanese 12-inch maxi single

A1. "Smooth Operator" – 5:25
A2. "Red Eye" – 3:18
B. "Spirit" – 5:28

== Charts ==
=== Weekly charts ===
1984–1985 weekly chart performance for "Smooth Operator"
Chart (1984–1985)	Peak position
Australia (Kent Music Report)	20
Austria (Ö3 Austria Top 40)	12
Belgium (Ultratop 50 Flanders)	19
Canada Top Singles (RPM)	5
Canada Adult Contemporary (RPM)	5
Europe (European Top 100 Singles)	7
France (SNEP)	9
Ireland (IRMA)	17
Italy (Musica e dischi)	16
Netherlands (Dutch Top 40)	19
Netherlands (Single Top 100)	12
New Zealand (Recorded Music NZ)	22
South Africa (Springbok Radio)	6
Switzerland (Schweizer Hitparade)	14
UK Singles (Official Charts)	19
US Billboard Hot 100	5
US Adult Contemporary (Billboard)	1
US Dance Club Songs (Billboard)	11
US Hot R&B/Hip-Hop Songs (Billboard)	5
US Cash Box Top 100 Singles	6
US Top 100 Black Contemporary Singles (Cash Box)	6
West Germany (GfK)	11

2023 weekly chart performance for "Smooth Operator"
Chart (2023)	Peak position
Greece International (IFPI)	66
Lithuania (AGATA)	47

=== Year-end charts ===
Year-end chart performance for "Smooth Operator"
Chart (1985)	Position
Canada Top Singles (RPM)	71
US Billboard Hot 100	62
US Adult Contemporary (Billboard)	10
US Hot R&B/Hip-Hop Songs (Billboard)	32
US Cash Box Top 100 Singles	57
US Top 100 Black Contemporary Singles (Cash Box)	21

== Certifications ==
Certifications for "Smooth Operator"
Region	Certification	Certified units/sales
Denmark (IFPI Danmark)	Platinum	90,000^{‡}
Germany (BVMI)	Gold	300,000^{‡}
Italy (FIMI) sales since 2009	Gold	50,000^{‡}
New Zealand (RMNZ)	Platinum	30,000^{‡}
United Kingdom (BPI)	Platinum	600,000^{‡}
^{‡} Sales+streaming figures based on certification alone.

== See also ==
- List of number-one adult contemporary singles of 1985 (U.S.)
