= The Ultimate Collection (Sade album) =

2010 greatest hits album by Sade

Greatest hits album by Sade
- Released: 29 April 2011
- Recorded: 1983–2011
- Length: 133:03
- Label: RCA
- Producers: Robin Millar; Mike Pela; Ben Rogan; Sade; Noah "40" Shebib

Sade chronology
Soldier of Love (2010)	The Ultimate Collection (2011)	This Far (2020)

Singles from The Ultimate Collection
- 1. "Still in Love with You" Released: 5 April 2011

Professional ratings
Review scores
Source	Rating
All About Jazz	3/5 stars
AllMusic	5/5 stars
Contactmusic.com	4.5/5 stars
Rolling Stone	4/5 stars

The Ultimate Collection is the second greatest hits album by English band Sade, released on 29 April 2011 by RCA Records. The album includes several singles from the band's career, including "Your Love Is King", "Smooth Operator", "By Your Side", "No Ordinary Love" and "Soldier of Love". It also contains four previously unreleased tracks—a cover of Thin Lizzy's 1974 song "Still in Love with You", a remix of "The Moon and the Sky" featuring Jay-Z, and the songs "I Would Never Have Guessed" and "Love Is Found". The band promoted the album with their first concert tour in 10 years, Sade Live. In March 2014, the album was re-released as The Essential Sade under the Sony Legacy umbrella.

== Critical reception ==
Will Hermes of Rolling Stone stated, "Few singers have the consistency of vision to produce a career retrospective that doubles as a seamless 'let's make out on the carpet' mixtape. From 1985's jazzy 'Smooth Operator' to tracks from last year's excellent Soldier of Love, it's all state-of-the-art slow-jams all the time, driven by Sade Adu's touch-me-now contralto." Lloyd Bradley of BBC Music commented, "The best thing about this set is it'll allow anybody who didn't quite get the band first time around to catch up." In a mixed review, Jeff Winbush of All About Jazz wrote, "No such luck. As things stand, a more accurate title would be The Adequate Collection because there's little ultimate about this bare bones piece of product."

== Commercial performance ==
The Ultimate Collection debuted at number eight on the UK Albums Chart with first-week sales of 15,184 copies, becoming Sade's seventh top-10 album in the United Kingdom. In the United States, the album entered the Billboard 200 at number seven with 38,000 copies sold in its first week, earning the band their ninth consecutive top-10 album on the chart. As of August 2011, the set had sold 127,000 copies in the United States.

== Track listing ==
Disc one
No.	Title	Writer(s)	Producer(s)	Length
1.	"Your Love Is King" (from Diamond Life, 1984)	Sade Adu; Stuart Matthewman	Robin Millar	3:42
2.	"Smooth Operator" (from Diamond Life)	Adu; Ray St. John	Millar	4:18
3.	"Hang On to Your Love" (from Diamond Life)	Adu; Matthewman	Millar	4:32
4.	"The Sweetest Taboo" (from Promise, 1985)	Adu; Martin Ditcham	Millar	4:27
5.	"Is It a Crime?" (from Promise)	Adu; Matthewman; Andrew Hale	Millar	6:22
6.	"Never as Good as the First Time" (from Promise)	Adu; Matthewman; Paul S. Denman; Hale	Millar; Ben Rogan; Mike Pela	3:58
7.	"Jezebel" (from Promise)	Adu; Matthewman	Millar	5:27
8.	"Love Is Stronger Than Pride" (from Stronger Than Pride, 1988)	Adu; Hale; Matthewman	Sade; Pela^{[a]}; Rogan^{[a]}	4:20
9.	"Paradise" (from Stronger Than Pride)	Adu; Hale; Matthewman; Denman	Sade; Pela^{[a]}; Rogan^{[a]}	3:38
10.	"Nothing Can Come Between Us" (from Stronger Than Pride)	Adu; Matthewman; Hale	Sade; Pela^{[a]}; Rogan^{[a]}	3:54
11.	"No Ordinary Love" (from Love Deluxe, 1992)	Adu; Matthewman	Sade; Pela^{[a]}	7:21
12.	"Kiss of Life" (from Love Deluxe)	Adu; Matthewman; Hale; Denman	Sade; Pela^{[a]}	4:14
13.	"Feel No Pain" (from Love Deluxe)	Adu; Hale; Matthewman	Sade; Pela^{[a]}	5:11
14.	"Bullet Proof Soul" (from Love Deluxe)	Adu; Matthewman; Hale	Sade; Pela^{[a]}	5:25

Disc two
No.	Title	Writer(s)	Producer(s)	Length
1.	"Cherish the Day" (from Love Deluxe)	Adu; Hale; Matthewman	Sade; Pela^{[a]}	6:20
2.	"Pearls" (from Love Deluxe)	Adu; Hale	Sade; Pela^{[a]}	4:34
3.	"By Your Side" (from Lovers Rock, 2000)	Adu; Matthewman; Hale; Denman	Sade; Pela^{[a]}	4:41
4.	"Immigrant" (from Lovers Rock)	Adu; Janusz Podrazik	Sade; Pela^{[a]}	3:50
5.	"Flow" (from Lovers Rock)	Adu; Matthewman; Hale; Denman	Sade; Pela^{[a]}	4:34
6.	"King of Sorrow" (from Lovers Rock)	Adu; Matthewman; Hale; Denman	Sade; Pela^{[a]}	4:47
7.	"The Sweetest Gift" (from Lovers Rock)	Adu; Matthewman	Sade; Pela^{[a]}	2:21
8.	"Soldier of Love" (from Soldier of Love, 2010)	Adu; Hale; Matthewman; Denman	Sade; Pela^{[a]}	5:58
9.	"The Moon and the Sky" (from Soldier of Love)	Adu; Matthewman; Hale	Sade; Pela^{[a]}	4:29
10.	"Babyfather" (from Soldier of Love)	Adu; Juan Janes; Andrew Nichols; Matthewman	Sade; Pela^{[a]}	4:40
11.	"Still in Love with You" (previously unreleased)	Gary Moore; Phil Lynott	Sade; Pela^{[a]}	4:26
12.	"Love Is Found" (previously unreleased)	Adu; Hale; Matthewman; Denman	Sade; Pela^{[a]}	4:11
13.	"I Would Never Have Guessed" (previously unreleased)	Adu; Hale; Tony Momrelle	Sade; Pela^{[a]}	2:57
14.	"The Moon and the Sky" (Remix featuring Jay-Z) (previously unreleased)	Adu; Matthewman; Hale	Noah "40" Shebib	4:27
15.	"By Your Side" (Neptunes Remix) (from "By Your Side" single, 2000)	Adu; Matthewman; Hale; Denman	Sade; Pela^{[a]}	3:59

Box set bonus DVD
No.	Title	Director	Length
1.	"Hang on to Your Love"	Brian Ward	3:59
2.	"The Sweetest Taboo"	Ward	5:02
3.	"Is It a Crime"	Ward	7:03
4.	"Never as Good as the First Time"	Ward	3:55
5.	"Love Is Stronger Than Pride"	Sophie Muller	4:24
6.	"Paradise"	Alex McDowell	3:35
7.	"Turn My Back on You"	Muller	4:05
8.	"Nothing Can Come Between Us"	Muller	3:52
9.	"No Ordinary Love"	Muller	4:01
10.	"Feel No Pain"	Albert Watson	3:48
11.	"Kiss of Life"	Watson	4:12
12.	"Cherish the Day"	Watson	4:23
13.	"By Your Side"	Muller	4:27
14.	"King of Sorrow"	Muller	4:42
15.	"Soldier of Love"	Muller	5:01
16.	"Babyfather"	Muller	4:01
Total length:			70:30

=== Notes ===
- ^{^[a]} signifies a co-producer

== Personnel ==
Credits adapted from the liner notes of The Ultimate Collection.

=== Sade ===
- Sade – arrangement (disc 1: tracks 8–14; disc 2: tracks 1–7, 15); strings, horns (disc 2: track 14)
- Sade Adu – vocals, programming
- Andrew Hale – keyboards, programming
- Stuart Matthewman – guitars, saxophone, programming
- Paul S. Denman – bass

=== Additional musicians ===
- Dave Early – drums, percussion (disc 1: tracks 1–7)
- Martin Ditcham – percussion (disc 1: tracks 1–6, 8–12, 14; disc 2: tracks 8–10); drums (disc 1: tracks 8–10, 12; disc 2: track 10)
- Paul Cooke – drums (disc 1: tracks 1, 3)
- Gordon Matthewman – trumpet (disc 1: track 1; disc 2: track 10)
- Terry Bailey – trumpet (disc 1: tracks 4, 5)
- Pete Beachill – trombone (disc 1: tracks 4, 5)
- Leroy Osbourne – vocals (disc 1: tracks 6, 8–14; disc 2: tracks 1–6, 8–11); guitar (disc 2: track 11)
- Jake Jacas – vocals (disc 1: track 6)
- Gordon Hunte – guitar (disc 1: track 9)
- Gavyn Wright – orchestra leader (disc 1: track 12; disc 2: track 2)
- Tony Pleeth – solo cello (disc 2: track 2)
- Karl Van Den Bossche – percussion (disc 2: tracks 3–6, 11)
- Tony Momrelle – vocals (disc 2: tracks 8–11)
- Ian Burdge – cello (disc 2: tracks 8, 9)
- Noel Langley – trumpet (disc 2: track 8)
- Everton Nelson – violin (disc 2: track 9)
- Pete Lewinson – drums (disc 2: tracks 10, 11)
- Ryan Waters – guitar (disc 2: track 11)
- Ben Travers – guitar (disc 2: track 12)
- Simon Hale – orchestra arrangement, orchestra conducting (disc 2: track 12)
- Jay-Z – featured artist (disc 2: track 14)
- 40 – all instruments except strings and horns (disc 2: track 14)

=== Technical ===
- Robin Millar – production (disc 1: tracks 1–7)
- Mike Pela – production engineering (disc 1: tracks 1–7); engineering (disc 1: tracks 8–14; disc two: tracks 1, 2, 8–13); production (disc 1: track 6); co-production (disc 1: tracks 8–14; disc 2: tracks 1–13, 15); recording (disc 2: tracks 3–7, 15); mixing (disc 2: tracks 8, 11–13)
- Pete Brown – engineering assistance (disc 1: tracks 1–7)
- Simon Driscoll – engineering assistance (disc 1: tracks 1–7)
- Phil Legg – engineering assistance (disc 1: tracks 4–7)
- Ben Rogan – production (disc 1: track 6); engineering, co-production (disc 1: tracks 8–10)
- Sade – production (disc 1: tracks 8–14; disc 2: tracks 1–13, 15)
- Melanie West – engineering assistance (disc 1: tracks 8–10)
- Vince McCartney – engineering assistance (disc 1: tracks 8–10)
- Franck Segarra – engineering assistance (disc 1: tracks 8–10)
- Olivier de Bosson – engineering assistance (disc 1: tracks 8–10)
- Alain Lubrano – engineering assistance (disc 1: tracks 8–10)
- Jean-Christophe Vareille – engineering assistance (disc 1: tracks 8–10)
- Sandro Franchin – engineering assistance (disc 1: tracks 11–14; disc 2: tracks 1, 2)
- Adrian Moore – engineering assistance (disc 1: tracks 11–14; disc 2: tracks 1, 2)
- Marc Williams – engineering assistance (disc 1: tracks 11–14; disc 2: tracks 1, 2)
- Andy "Nipper" Davies – engineering assistance (disc 2: tracks 3–6)
- Mark "Spike" Stent – mixing (disc 2: tracks 9, 10)
- Mat Arnold – engineering assistance (disc 2: track 11)
- Jamie Brownlow – engineering assistance (disc 2: track 11)
- Owen Shiers – engineering assistance (disc 2: track 11)
- Nick Poortman – engineering assistance (disc 2: tracks 12, 13)
- Brendan Davies – engineering assistance (disc 2: tracks 12, 13)
- Mike Nyandoro – engineering assistance (disc 2: tracks 12, 13)
- Gary Thomas – engineering (disc 2: track 12)
- Isobel Griffiths – contractor (disc 2: track 12)
- Noah "40" Shebib – production, engineering (disc 2: track 14)
- Noel Cadastre – engineering (disc 2: track 14)
- Gimel "Young Guru" Keaton – recording (Jay-Z's verse) (disc 2: track 14)
- Noel "Gadget" Campbell – mixing (disc 2: track 14)
- David Strickland – mix assistance (disc 2: track 14)
- Greg Morrison – mix assistance (disc 2: track 14)
- The Neptunes – mixing (disc 2: track 15)
- Lynn Jeffrey – band assistance
- John Davis – mastering
- Adam Brown – tape transfer
- Kevin Vanbergen – tape transfer
- Richard Bowe – archiving

=== Artwork ===
- Sophie Muller – photography

== Charts ==
=== Weekly charts ===
Weekly chart performance for The Ultimate Collection
Chart (2011)	Peak position
Australian Albums (ARIA)	35
Australian Urban Albums (ARIA)	8
Austrian Albums (Ö3 Austria)	22
Belgian Albums (Ultratop Flanders)	8
Belgian Albums (Ultratop Wallonia)	13
Canadian Albums (Nielsen SoundScan)	32
Croatian Albums (HDU)	1
Czech Albums (ČNS IFPI)	1
Danish Albums (Hitlisten)	7
Dutch Albums (Album Top 100)	12
Finnish Albums (Suomen virallinen lista)	18
French Albums (SNEP)	23
German Albums (Offizielle Top 100)	17
Greek Albums (IFPI)	9
Hungarian Albums (MAHASZ)	4
Irish Albums (IRMA)	10
Italian Albums (FIMI)	10
Japanese Albums (Oricon)	22
Mexican Albums (Top 100 Mexico)	42
New Zealand Albums (RMNZ)	21
Norwegian Albums (VG-lista)	19
Polish Albums (ZPAV)	1
Portuguese Albums (AFP)	22
Russian Albums (2M)	8
Scottish Albums (Official Charts)	12
Spanish Albums (Promusicae)	14
Swedish Albums (Sverigetopplistan)	6
Swiss Albums (Schweizer Hitparade)	11
UK Albums (Official Charts)	8
US Billboard 200	7
US Top R&B/Hip-Hop Albums (Billboard)	2

=== Year-end charts ===
2011 year-end chart performance for The Ultimate Collection
Chart (2011)	Position
Australian Urban Albums (ARIA)	37
Belgian Albums (Ultratop Flanders)	73
Belgian Albums (Ultratop Wallonia)	84
Hungarian Albums (MAHASZ)	32
Polish Albums (ZPAV)	2
Russian Albums (2M)	20
Swedish Albums (Sverigetopplistan)	92
US Top R&B/Hip-Hop Albums (Billboard)	50

2012 year-end chart performance for The Ultimate Collection
Chart (2012)	Position
Australian Urban Albums (ARIA)	48

2016 year-end chart performance for The Ultimate Collection
Chart (2016)	Position
Polish Albums (ZPAV)	12

== Certifications ==
Certifications for The Ultimate Collection
Region	Certification	Certified units/sales
Denmark (IFPI Danmark)	Gold	10,000^{‡}
Hungary (MAHASZ)	Gold	3,000^{^}
Italy (FIMI)	Gold	25,000^{*}
Poland (ZPAV)	4× Platinum	80,000^{*}
United Kingdom (BPI)	Gold	100,000^{‡}
^{*} Sales figures based on certification alone.^{^} Shipments figures based on certification alone.^{‡} Sales+streaming figures based on certification alone.

== Release history ==
Release dates and formats for The Ultimate Collection
Region	Date	Format	Label	Ref(s)
Australia	29 April 2011	CD; digital download	Sony	
Germany	29 April 2011	CD; CD + DVD; digital download	Sony	
France	2 May 2011	CD; CD + DVD; digital download	Sony	
United States	3 May 2011	CD; digital download	Epic	
United Kingdom	9 May 2011	CD; CD + DVD; digital download	RCA	
Germany	20 May 2011	LP	Sony	
United Kingdom	23 May 2011	LP	RCA	
United States	24 May 2011	LP	Epic	
Japan	22 June 2011	CD	Sony	
