= Sade Live =

2011 concert tour by Sade

- Tour by Sade
- Promotional poster for the tour
- Associated albums: Soldier of Love; The Ultimate Collection
- Start date: 29 April 2011
- End date: 16 December 2011
- Legs: 5
- No. of shows: 38 in Europe; 54 in North America; 5 in South America; 6 in Australia; 1 in Asia; 104 total (4 cancelled)
- Box office: $83.3 million

Sade concert chronology
- Lovers Rock Tour (2001); Sade Live (2011); ...

Sade Live (also known as the Once in a Lifetime Tour or the Soldier of Love Tour) was the sixth concert tour by British band Sade. Visiting Europe, the Americas, Australia and Asia the tour supports the band's sixth studio album, Soldier of Love and their second greatest hits album, The Ultimate Collection. This trek marked the band's first tour in nearly a decade. The tour ranked 27th in Pollstar's "Top 50 Worldwide Tour (Mid-Year)", earning over 20 million dollars. At the conclusion of 2011, the tour placed tenth on Billboard's annual, "Top 25 Tours", earning over $50 million with 59 shows.

== Background and response ==
The tour was officially announced on 30 September 2010 via press release. Shortly, media outlets began to buzz over the tour. Concurrently, the announcement of the tour followed the band's recent studio album, Soldier of Love, certified platinum in the United States. Advertised as a world tour, the initial announcement showed ten dates in the Southeastern United States. Soon after, dates in the United Kingdom and Europe were announced as well—giving the band its first performances in nearly two decades. At the start of 2011, the album was nominated for two Grammy Awards, prompting the band to add additional dates in the U.S.. During this time, American recording artist John Legend was revealed to be the opening act for the North American leg of the tour. Additional dates in Europe and North America followed. Frontwoman, Sade, described touring as being on a thrill ride at an amusement park. She further commented, "Once you’re on the ride, you’re so involved in it that it's almost too late to say, 'What am I doing?’ In some ways, I'm already psyched up [for the tour]. You have to know that it's going to be good to bring yourself to do it."

To introduce the tour, Adu stated:

"You can never translate the reality of a show, which is good. I like to think this tour will be better than ever. We’re aiming high", she said. "It's a big production. It's going to be quite theatrical and hopefully visually do a good service to the songs and represent them well and take you somewhere. Hopefully, when people leave, they’ll leave with something."

Billboard magazine devoted its August 2011 cover story to the tour, highlighting details of the tour and its financial response. Sade's longtime collaborator Sophie Muller served as creative director of the tour while Baz Halpin (known for his work on tours by P!nk and Tina Turner) handled production and lighting design (including the jumbo LED screen that flashed imagery behind Sade while she's performed). According to the Billboard cover story, from 16 June to 14 August, the tour had grossed $31.4 million and drew 345,441 concert-goers to 36 concerts, of which 16 were sell-outs. As of 1 June, the band ranked as the eighth highest-grossing tour based on reported boxscores and ranked number-seven in concerts for ticket prices for the band range from $20 to $180 in various markets. Due to the success of the tour, new dates were added in Australia which marked the band's second tour there in almost twenty years.

== Broadcasts and recordings ==
During the American leg of Sade's 2011 tour, British director, Sophie Muller, captured the band's two-hour show for release on DVD, with accompanying Live CD. In addition to the concert, Sade also granted rare glimpses of behind-the-stage scenes with a 20-minute documentary, exclusive candid moments, a short technical documentary by Stuart Matthewman, and outtakes from the crew.

== Opening acts ==
- The Jolly Boys (first European leg)
- John Legend (North America)

== Setlist ==
1. "Soldier of Love"
2. "Your Love Is King"
3. "Skin"
4. "Kiss of Life"
5. "Love is Found"
6. "In Another Time"
7. "Smooth Operator"
8. "Jezebel"
9. "Bring Me Home"
10. "Is It a Crime"
11. "Love is Stronger Than Pride" (after first leg only) / Still in Love With You (first leg only)
12. "All About Our Love"
13. Medley: "Paradise" / "Nothing Can Come Between Us"
14. "Morning Bird"
15. "King of Sorrow"
16. "The Sweetest Taboo"
17. "The Moon and the Sky"
18. "Pearls"
19. "No Ordinary Love"
20. "By Your Side"

Encore

21. "Cherish the Day"

== Tour dates ==
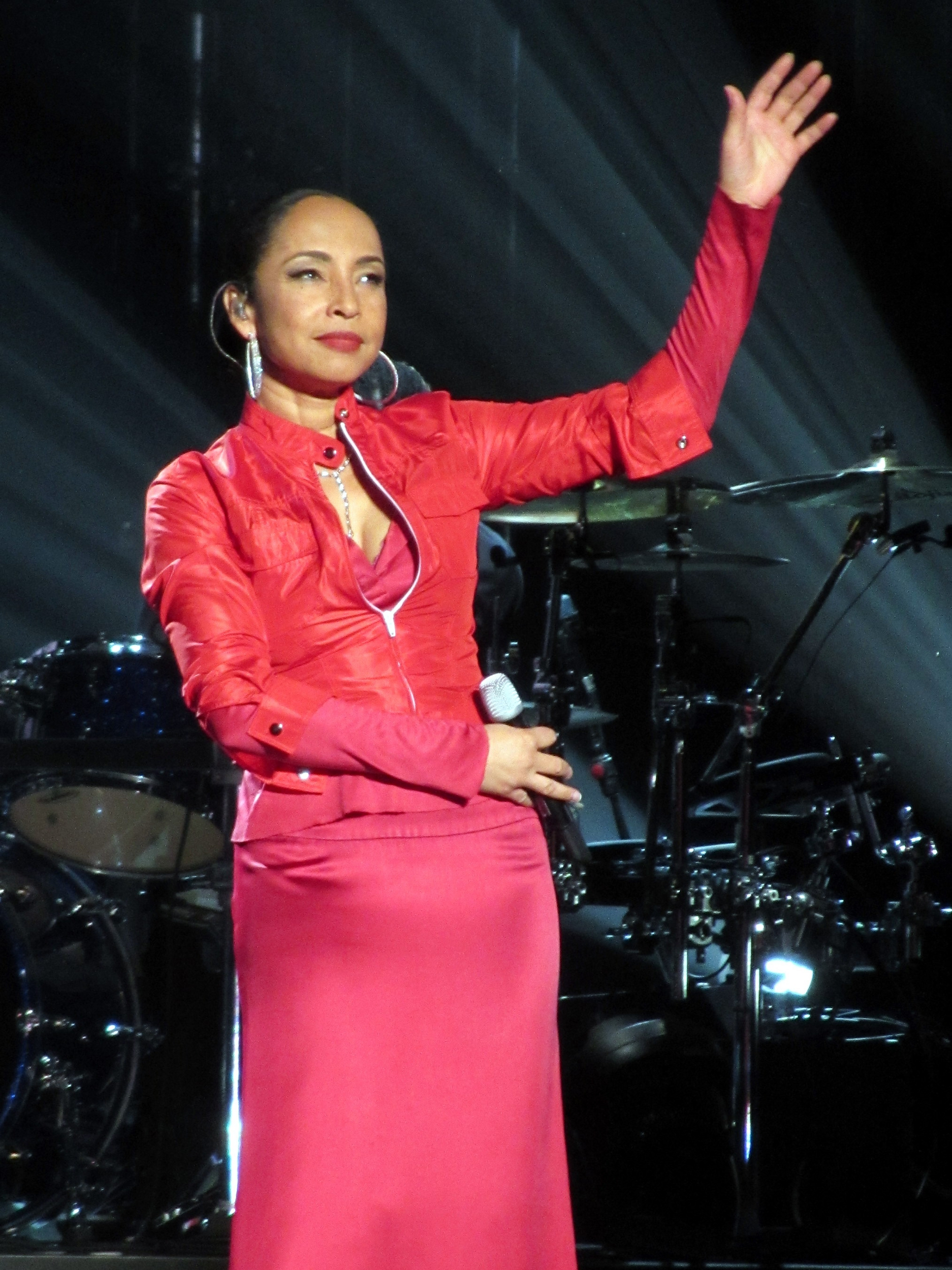
Sade performing at the SAP Arena, Mannheim, Germany, in 2011

Date	City	Country	Venue
Europe
29 April 2011	Nice	France	Palais Nikaïa
1 May 2011	Antwerp	Belgium	Sportpaleis
3 May 2011	Hamburg	Germany	O_{2} World Hamburg
4 May 2011	Oberhausen	Germany	König Pilsener Arena
6 May 2011	Milan	Italy	Mediolanum Forum
7 May 2011	Stuttgart	Germany	Hanns-Martin-Schleyer-Halle
9 May 2011	Copenhagen	Denmark	Forum Copenhagen
10 May 2011	Stockholm	Sweden	Ericsson Globe
12 May 2011	Frankfurt	Germany	Festhalle Frankfurt
13 May 2011	Berlin	Germany	O_{2} World
14 May 2011	Prague	Czech Republic	O_{2} Arena
16 May 2011	Zürich	Switzerland	Hallenstadion
17 May 2011	Paris	France	Palais Omnisports de Paris-Bercy
19 May 2011	Munich	Germany	Olympiahalle
20 May 2011	Metz	France	Galaxie Amnéville
21 May 2011	Cologne	Germany	Lanxess Arena
23 May 2011	Rotterdam	Netherlands	Rotterdam Ahoy
25 May 2011	Dublin	Ireland	The O_{2}
27 May 2011	Manchester	England	Manchester Evening News Arena
29 May 2011	Birmingham	England	LG Arena
31 May 2011	London	England	The O_{2} Arena
North America
16 June 2011	Baltimore	United States	1st Mariner Arena
18 June 2011	Pittsburgh	United States	Consol Energy Center
19 June 2011	Philadelphia	United States	Wells Fargo Center
21 June 2011	Uniondale	United States	Nassau Veterans Memorial Coliseum
22 June 2011	Washington, D.C.	United States	Verizon Center
24 June 2011	East Rutherford	United States	Izod Center
25 June 2011	Newark	United States	Prudential Center
28 June 2011	Toronto	Canada	Air Canada Centre
30 June 2011^{[A]}	Montreal	Canada	Bell Centre
2 July 2011	Atlantic City	United States	Etess Arena
3 July 2011	Uncasville	United States	Mohegan Sun Arena
6 July 2011	Boston	United States	TD Garden
8 July 2011	Indianapolis	United States	Conseco Fieldhouse
9 July 2011	Cleveland	United States	Quicken Loans Arena
10 July 2011	Columbus	United States	Value City Arena
12 July 2011	Atlanta	United States	Philips Arena
13 July 2011	Atlanta	United States	Philips Arena
15 July 2011	Sunrise	United States	Bank Atlantic Center
16 July 2011	Miami	United States	American Airlines Arena
17 July 2011	Orlando	United States	Amway Center
22 July 2011	New Orleans	United States	New Orleans Arena
23 July 2011	Houston	United States	Toyota Center
24 July 2011	Dallas	United States	American Airlines Center
26 July 2011	Kansas City	United States	Sprint Center
28 July 2011	St. Louis	United States	Scottrade Center
29 July 2011	Memphis	United States	FedExForum
31 July 2011	Charlotte	United States	Time Warner Cable Arena
1 August 2011	Nashville	United States	Bridgestone Arena
3 August 2011	Auburn Hills	United States	The Palace of Auburn Hills
5 August 2011	Chicago	United States	United Center
6 August 2011	Chicago	United States	United Center
7 August 2011	Chicago	United States	United Center
9 August 2011	Minneapolis	United States	Target Center
11 August 2011	Denver	United States	Pepsi Center
13 August 2011	Vancouver	Canada	Rogers Arena
14 August 2011	Seattle	United States	KeyArena
15 August 2011	Portland	United States	Moda Center
17 August 2011	Sacramento	United States	Sleep Train Arena
19 August 2011	Los Angeles	United States	Staples Center
20 August 2011	Los Angeles	United States	Staples Center
21 August 2011	Los Angeles	United States	Staples Center
23 August 2011	Chula Vista	United States	Cricket Wireless Amphitheatre
25 August 2011	San Jose	United States	SAP Center
26 August 2011	Oakland	United States	Oracle Arena
27 August 2011	Oakland	United States	Oracle Arena
30 August 2011	Anaheim	United States	Honda Center
31 August 2011	Anaheim	United States	Honda Center
2 September 2011	Phoenix	United States	US Airways Center
3 September 2011	Las Vegas	United States	MGM Grand Garden Arena
4 September 2011	Ontario	United States	Citizens Business Bank Arena
7 September 2011	Austin	United States	Frank Erwin Center
9 September 2011	Louisville	United States	KFC Yum! Center
10 September 2011	Greensboro	United States	Greensboro Coliseum
12 September 2011	Norfolk	United States	Norfolk Scope
South America
12 October 2011	Santiago	Chile	Movistar Arena
13 October 2011	Santiago	Chile	Movistar Arena
15 October 2011	Buenos Aires	Argentina	Predio Vicente López al Río
20 October 2011	São Paulo	Brazil	Ginásio do Ibirapuera
22 October 2011	Rio de Janeiro	Brazil	HSBC Arena
25 October 2011	Brasília	Brazil	Nilson Nelson Gymnasium
Europe
29 October 2011	Sofia	Bulgaria	Armeets Arena
30 October 2011	Belgrade	Serbia	Belgrade Arena
2 November 2011	Tallinn	Estonia	Saku Suurhall
3 November 2011	Helsinki	Finland	Hartwall Areena
5 November 2011	St. Petersburg	Russia	Ice Palace Saint Petersburg
7 November 2011	Moscow	Russia	Crocus City Hall
8 November 2011	Moscow	Russia	Crocus City Hall
11 November 2011	Łódź	Poland	Atlas Arena
13 November 2011	Bratislava	Slovakia	Ondrej Nepela Arena
15 November 2011	Leipzig	Germany	Arena Leipzig
16 November 2011	Mannheim	Germany	SAP Arena
18 November 2011	Zurich	Switzerland	Hallenstadion
19 November 2011	Dortmund	Germany	Westfalenhallen
20 November 2011	Antwerp	Belgium	Lotto Arena
22 November 2011	Zagreb	Croatia	Arena Zagreb
23 November 2011	Budapest	Hungary	Budapest Sports Arena
25 November 2011	Vienna	Austria	Wiener Stadthalle
Australia
2 December 2011	Melbourne	Australia	Rod Laver Arena
3 December 2011	Adelaide	Australia	Adelaide Entertainment Centre
6 December 2011^{[B]}	Perth	Australia	The Esplanade
9 December 2011	Sydney	Australia	Sydney Entertainment Centre
10 December 2011	Sydney	Australia	Sydney Entertainment Centre
12 December 2011	Brisbane	Australia	Brisbane Entertainment Centre
Asia
16 December 2011^{[C]}	Abu Dhabi	United Arab Emirates	Du Arena

Festivals and other miscellaneous performances
^{A} This concert was a part of the Montreal International Jazz Festival
^{B} This concert is a part of "A Day on the Green"
^{C} This concert is a part of "Yas Island Weekends"

Cancellations and rescheduled shows

20 November 2011	Herning, Denmark	Jyske Bank Boxen	Cancelled
3 December 2011	McLaren Vale, Australia	Leconfield Wines Estate	Cancelled. This concert was a part of "A Day on the Green".
6 December 2011	Perth, Australia	Kings Park	This concert was moved to The Esplanade
10 December 2011	Pokolbin, Australia	Hope Estate Winery Amphitheatre	Cancelled. This concert was a part of "A Day on the Green".
14 December 2011	Brisbane, Australia	Brisbane Entertainment Centre	Rescheduled to 12 December 2011
16 December 2011^{[B]}	Yarra Valley, Australia	Rochford Wines Estate	Cancelled. This concert was a part of "A Day on the Green".

=== Box office score data ===
Venue	City	Tickets sold / Available	Gross revenue
Sportpaleis	Antwerp	10,776 / 11,541 (93%)	$892,738
Barclaycard Arena	Hamburg	6,902 / 9,394 (73%)	$682,871
Mercedes-Benz Arena	Berlin	11,534 / 11,737 (98%)	$1,055,610
Manchester Arena	Manchester	3,838 / 5,207 (74%)	$414,863
The O_{2} Arena	London	11,478 / 13,020 (88%)	$1,196,940
Royal Farms Arena	Baltimore	12,313 / 12,313 (100%)	$1,241,794
PPG Paints Arena	Pittsburgh	7,760 / 9,075 (85%)	$459,873
Wells Fargo Center	Philadelphia	11,936 / 13,809 (86%)	$1,297,328
Nassau Veterans Memorial Coliseum	Uniondale	11,077 / 12,406 (89%)	$1,144,054
Verizon Center	Washington, D.C.	11,948 / 12,410 (96%)	$1,299,056
Izod Center	East Rutherford	13,154 / 13,154 (100%)	$1,495,963
Prudential Center	Newark	11,574 / 11,574 (100%)	$1,161,086
Air Canada Centre	Toronto	12,679 / 12,679 (100%)	$1,308,311
Bell Centre	Montreal	9,827 / 11,423 (86%)	$1,161,940
Etess Arena	Atlantic City	4,119 / 4,119 (100%)	$359,820
Mohegan Sun Arena	Uncasville	5,879 / 6,933 (85%)	$585,300
TD Garden	Boston	9,422 / 11,334 (83%)	$937,064
Bankers Field Fieldhouse	Indianapolis	5,232 / 7,070 (74%)	$410,829
Quicken Loans Arena	Cleveland	8,969 / 10,222 (88%)	$497,014
Value City Arena	Columbus	7,562 / 7,886 (96%)	$457,197
Philips Arena	Atlanta	21,870 / 23,374 (93%)	$1,968,933
BB&T Center	Sunrise	11,213 / 11,213 (100%)	$1,183,167
American Airlines Arena	Miami	12,159 / 12,159 (100%)	$1,034,880
Amway Center	Orlando	10,401 / 12,290 (85%)	$1,076,849
Smoothie King Center	New Orleans	8,726 / 8,726 (100%)	$737,646
Toyota Center	Houston	13,304 / 13,304 (100%)	$1,287,191
American Airlines Center	Dallas	12,825 / 12,825 (100%)	$1,163,311
Sprint Center	Kansas City	8,224 / 9,953 (83%)	$487,758
Scottrade Center	St. Louis	6,898 / 9,000 (77%)	$459,201
FedExForum	Memphis	7,020 / 7,600 (92%)	$622,278
Time Warner Cable Arena	Charlotte	11,256 / 13,786 (82%)	$891,286
Bridgestone Arena	Nashville	4,093 / 9,089 (45%)	$287,204
The Palace of Auburn Hills	Auburn Hills	9,146 / 13,572 (67%)	$796,907
United Center	Chicago	30,834 / 32,124 (96%)	$2,983,195
Target Center	Minneapolis	6,194 / 8,052 (77%)	$451,669
Pepsi Center	Denver	7,352 / 8,812 (83%)	$608,446
Rogers Arena	Vancouver	9,136 / 9,947 (92%)	$724,297
KeyArena	Seattle	9,919 / 11,575 (86%)	$847,148
Moda Center	Portland	4,323 / 11,306 (38%)	$317,594
Sleep Train Arena	Sacramento	9,415 / 11,500 (82%)	$566,731
Staples Center	Los Angeles	40,810 / 40,810 (100%)	$4,711,593
Cricket Wireless Amphitheatre	Chula Vista	15,652 / 19,522 (80%)	$989,128
SAP Center	San Jose	11,852 / 11,852 (100%)	$1,176,039
Oracle Arena	Oakland	24,544 / 24,544 (100%)	$2,220,179
Honda Center	Anaheim	24,648 / 24,648 (100%)	$2,269,039
Talking Stick Resort Arena	Phoenix	11,949 / 11,949 (100%)	$1,002,898
MGM Grand Garden Arena	Las Vegas	12,973 / 12,973 (100%)	$1,392,963
Citizens Business Bank Arena	Ontario	8,323 / 8,323 (100%)	$624,818
Frank Erwin Center	Austin	8,476 / 10,967 (77%)	$636,494
KFC Yum! Center	Louisville	7,927 / 7,927 (100%)	$475,706
Greensboro Coliseum	Greensboro	8,154 / 9,264 (88%)	$502,154
Norfolk Scope	Norfolk	7,245 / 7,245 (100%)	$573,017
Lotto Arena	Antwerp	3,993 / 4,271 (93%)	$348,586
TOTAL		588,833 / 651,808 (90%)	$53,477,956
