= Flower of the Universe =

Single by Sade

from the album A Wrinkle in Time (Original Motion Picture Soundtrack)
- Released: 7 March 2018
- Length: 3:49
- Label: Sony
- Songwriters: Sade Adu; Andrew Hale; Ben Travers
- Producers: Adu; Hale; Travers

Sade singles chronology
"Still in Love with You" (2011)	"Flower of the Universe" (2018)	"The Big Unknown" (2018)

Lyric video
- "Flower of the Universe" on YouTube

"Flower of the Universe" is a song recorded by the British singer Sade Adu for the soundtrack to the 2018 film A Wrinkle in Time. Written and produced by Sade, Andrew Hale and Ben Travers, it was released as the lead single from the soundtrack, serving as Sade's first song in seven years. The song starts at No. 25 on "R&B/Hip-Hop Digital Song Sales" with 6,000 sold in the week ending March 15, 2018.

== Background ==
The film's director Ava DuVernay revealed the song in a tweet on 20 February 2018, alongside a GIF of Sade. "I never thought she'd say yes, but asked anyway. She was kind plus giving. A goddess. We began a journey together that I'll never forget. Proud to announce that Sade has created an original song for Wrinkle in Time. It's entitled 'Flower of the Universe.' And it's a dream come true."

== Reception ==
Jordan Sargent of Spin commented "Flower of the Universe" feels of a piece with Soldier of Love—the band’s most recent album, released in 2010—which sucked the grooves out of their sound in favor of a stillness that conveyed both the vulnerability and strength inherent in isolation. Likewise, there are no drums present on “Flower of the Universe”—instead, the song’s arrangement (written in tandem with bandmate Andrew Hale and another collaborator, Ben Travers) is constructed only from the strums of an acoustic guitar and cooed backing harmonies that seem to stretch far and wide. The song—about a mother’s eternal love—suggests that Sade is out somewhere in the wilderness, detached from the rest of humanity. It invites repeated listens and eventually envelops you, offering a calming, nourishing comfort. Andrew Flanagan of NPR stated "The track is classic Sade — a lush, honey sway, a voice like thick, slow-motion silk." Ben Baumont-Thomas of The Guardian noted "Backed by pretty acoustic guitar and almost eerie wordless backing vocals, Sade delivers a typically spellbinding vocal line. The sentimental lyric is aimed at a child, described as a "flower of the universe".

== Track listing ==
Digital download
No.	Title	Length
1.	"Flower of the Universe"	3:49
2.	"Flower of the Universe" (No I.D. remix)	4:06

== Credits and personnel ==
Credits adapted from Tidal.

- Sade Adu – composition, production, vocals
- Andrew Hale – composition, production
- Ben Travers – composition, production
- Miles Showell – master engineering
