= Still in Love with You (Thin Lizzy song) =

1986 single by Bobby Tench

- "Still in Love with You" as the B-side to the "Thunder and Lightning" single, 1983

Song by Thin Lizzy

from the album Nightlife
- Released: November 1974
- Recorded: March and October 1974
- Genre: Blues rock
- Length: 5:40
- Label: Mercury
- Songwriter: Phil Lynott
- Producers: Phil Lynott; Ron Nevison

"Still in Love with You" is a song originally recorded by Thin Lizzy. The studio version was first released on their 1974 album, Nightlife; and went on to be a live favourite, showcasing the guitarists, including Brian Robertson, Scott Gorham, Gary Moore, Snowy White, and John Sykes. Live versions were released on the albums Live and Dangerous, Life, BBC Radio One Live in Concert, The Peel Sessions and One Night Only.

== Composition ==
The studio version was recorded at Saturn Studios, Worthing, in March 1974, with Phil Lynott on vocals and bass, Gary Moore on guitar, and Brian Downey on drums. Moore later said the song was a combination of two pieces; Lynott's "Still in Love With You" with his "I'll Help You See It Through", which he had been working on for some years. Moore left the band the following month, and the song ended up being credited on Nightlife to Lynott alone.

"Still in Love with You" was one of the demos that secured the group's contract with Phonogram Records in summer 1974, by which time Moore had been replaced by guitarists Brian Robertson and Scott Gorham. Manager Chris O'Donnell later said he lied to the Phonogram representatives, saying Robertson (then aged 17) played the solo instead of Moore. The group returned to Saturn Sound in October to add overdubs.

On his video, Still in Love with the Blues, Robertson described the song as "a slow blues".

== Live and later versions ==
Originally, the song was a duet between Lynott and Moore (as can be heard on an early BBC session recording), but following Moore's departure Scottish singer Frankie Miller was recruited to replace his vocal parts. However, Robertson refused to similarly re-record Moore's guitar solo, believing that it could not be improved upon. Despite this, Robertson would go on to consider "Still in Love with You" his signature song, and would not let it be removed from the band's setlist. The song was featured as a set-closer in the band's live shows and became a showcase for each of the band's subsequent guitarists, including Moore (who rejoined and replaced Robertson), Snowy White (who replaced Moore), and John Sykes (who replaced White), featuring in their live set until the band split in 1983.

The song is usually played in the key of A minor but Thin Lizzy often down-tuned half a step when playing live for a heavier live sound, as is the case for the double live album, Live and Dangerous, making the actual key a concert pitch A-flat minor.

Live versions of the song were also released as the B-side of the "Thunder and Lightning" single in April 1983, and as one of four tracks on the 12" release of "Dedication" in 1991. A re-recording appeared as a B-side to the "Out in the Fields" double single and 12" by Gary Moore and Phil Lynott in 1985.

After Lynott's death, the touring version of Thin Lizzy performed the song as a duet in 2011–12, with vocals shared between keyboard player Darren Wharton and frontman Ricky Warwick.

In 2020, Thin Lizzy released a 6CD+DVD box set, entitled Rock Legends. CD No. 6 featured a previously unreleased concert from the band's Chinatown tour in 1980, recorded at the Hammersmith Odeon in London, England. The set list contained a live version of "Still in Love With You" with Snowy White on guitar.

== Reception ==
AllMusic's review of the song says it "is widely considered to be Thin Lizzy's greatest, most romantic ballad."

The Live and Dangerous performance was described by Mark Putterford as the highlight of Lynott's musical career.

== Cover versions ==
=== Bobby Tench ===
"Still in Love with You"

Single by Bobby Tench
- B-side: "Heart out of Love"
- Released: 1986
- Recorded: 1986
- Genre: Rock
- Length: 5:46
- Label: Stiff
- Songwriter: Phil Lynott
- Producers: Steve Bown; Bobby Tench

Bobby Tench singles chronology
"Chain Gang" (1982)	"Still in Love with You" (1986)

A cover of this song was recorded by Bobby Tench, and released on the Stiff label in 1986. This version features Thin Lizzy guitarist Brian Robertson and the B-side is entitled "Heart out of Love" which was co-written by Peter Bardens and Tench.

=== Sade ===
"Still in Love With You"

Single by Sade

from the album The Ultimate Collection
- Released: 5 April 2011
- Recorded: 2010
- Genre: R&B
- Length: 4:26
- Label: Sony Music UK
- Songwriter: Phil Lynott
- Producer: Sade

Sade singles chronology
"The Moon and the Sky" (2010)	"Still in Love With You" (2011)	"Flower of the Universe" (2018)

Licensed audio
- "Still in Love with You" on YouTube

British R&B/soul band Sade covered the song on their 2011 compilation album The Ultimate Collection. It was released as the first single from the album and was included on the Sade Live Tour setlist. In Europe, it was released as a promo single along with another song from the album titled "Love Is Found".

Sade's cover of the song received a positive reception from critics upon its release. Billboard described Sade's cover as "one of the group's finest unreleased treasures" in its review of the single. Andy Kellman of AllMusic called the song "the best of the new songs" from the new compilation.

==== Charts (Sade's version) ====
Chart performance for "Still in Love with You"
Chart (2011)	Peak position
CIS Airplay (TopHit)	198
Japan Hot 100 (Billboard)	27
US Hot R&B/Hip-Hop Songs (Billboard)	55
US Smooth Jazz Airplay (Billboard)	6
