= I Believe (DJ Khaled song) =

Single by DJ Khaled featuring Demi Lovato

from the album A Wrinkle in Time (Original Motion Picture Soundtrack)
- Released: March 7, 2018
- Length: 3:44
- Label: Epic
- Songwriters: Khaled Khaled; Demi Lovato; Denisia Andrews; Brittany Coney
- Producer: DJ Khaled

DJ Khaled singles chronology
"Top Off" (2018)	"I Believe" (2018)	"Dinero" (2018)

Demi Lovato singles chronology
"Échame la Culpa" (2017)	"I Believe" (2018)	"Fall in Line" (2018)

Music video
- "I Believe" on YouTube

"I Believe" is a song by American record producer DJ Khaled featuring American singer Demi Lovato. Written alongside Denisia Andrews and Brittany Coney, it was released by Epic Records on March 7, 2018, as the third single from the soundtrack to the 2018 film A Wrinkle in Time. The song surrounds the message of believing in oneself.

== Release and promotion ==
Lovato first teased the song on February 20, 2018, writing on Twitter: "Ahhhh!! I'm so excited to finally tell you guys my new song ['I Believe'] with [DJ Khaled] will be on the soundtrack for Disney's [Wrinkle in Time]," along with a snippet. On March 6, 2018, a preview of the music video debuted on Good Morning America.

== Music video ==
The song's music video was directed by Hannah Lux Davis. It features Khaled and Lovato singing in various green-screen landscapes, including a golden wheat field, a dark forest and a natural backdrop surrounded by lush grass and blue skies, intercut with movie scenes. Lovato dresses up in a red gown, while Khaled wears a tracksuit.

== Critical reception ==
Elias Leight of Rolling Stone deemed the song "a meeting of maximalists" with "Lovato singing with her usual boisterous enthusiasm" and Khaled "offering a series of self-help maxims". Aaron Williams of Uproxx regarded the song as "a full-on display of Demi Lovato's vocal chops". Devin Ch of HotNewHipHop opined that the song "mostly caters to urban-pop playlists", writing that its message is "accessible on all fronts".

== Credits and personnel ==
Credits adapted from Tidal.

- DJ Khaled – composition, production, vocals
- Demi Lovato – composition, vocals
- Denisia Andrews – composition
- Brittany Coney – composition

== Charts ==
Chart (2018)	Peak position
Israel (Media Forest TV Airplay)	4
