= Haunt Me =

Song by Sade

Single by Sade

from the album Stronger Than Pride
- B-side: "Make Some Room"
- Released: February 1989
- Recorded: 1987–1988
- Genre: Smooth jazz
- Length: 5:48
- Label: Epic
- Composers: Sade Adu; Stuart Matthewman
- Lyricist: Sade Adu
- Producer: Sade

Sade singles chronology
"Turn My Back on You" (1988)	"Haunt Me" (1989)	"No Ordinary Love" (1992)

Audio
- "Haunt Me" on YouTube

"Haunt Me" is a song by English band Sade from their third studio album, Stronger Than Pride (1988). It was released solely in the United Kingdom as the album's fifth and final single.

== Reception ==
Stephen Holden of The New York Times described "Haunt Me" as "a tender, almost abject confession of devotion that seems to waft up from a pillow at high siesta. Sung against a glowing arrangement for classical guitar, piano and strings, Sade offers unconditional love: 'And if you want to sleep/ I'll be quiet/ Like an angel/ As quiet as your soul could be/ If you only knew/ You had a friend like me.'" Frank Guan of Vulture commented, "Piano, guitar, longing, capped off by a sax solo. Take some time to realize how incredible it is that half of Sade's catalogue exceeds a song of this quality."

== Track listings ==
- UK 7-inch single

A. "Haunt Me" – 5:48
B. "Make Some Room" – 3:24

- UK 12-inch single

A. "Haunt Me" – 5:48
B. "Make Some Room" – 5:00
