= Turn My Back on You =

Single by Sade

from the album Stronger Than Pride
- B-side: "Keep Looking"
- Released: 14 November 1988
- Genre: Disco-funk; dub
- Length: 6:05
- Label: Epic
- Composers: Sade Adu; Andrew Hale; Stuart Matthewman
- Lyricist: Sade Adu
- Producer: Sade

Sade singles chronology
"Nothing Can Come Between Us" (1988)	"Turn My Back on You" (1988)	"Haunt Me" (1989)

Music video
- "Turn My Back on You" on YouTube

"Turn My Back on You" is a song by English band Sade from their third studio album, Stronger Than Pride (1988). It was released as the album's fourth single on 14 November 1988.

== Reception ==
Sophie Heawood of The Guardian commented, "Anchored by a bassline that feels like it could go on forever, Sade's light touch defines this. Her casualness and distracted ba-ba-bas belie her devotion, but it's all in the details: the crucial pause in the way she sings 'You are my ... religion,' for instance." Frank Guan of Vulture wrote, "Complicated lyrics would only get in the way of that massive bass line. Sade sticks to plain professions of fidelity and leaves it to Paul Denman to carry the day."

== Track listings ==
- 7-inch single

A. "Turn My Back on You" (re-mix) – 4:11
B. "Keep Looking" – 5:21

- 12-inch single

A. "Turn My Back on You" (extended re-mix) – 6:09
B1. "Turn My Back on You" (Heff's mix) – 7:06
B2. "Keep Looking" – 5:21

- UK and European CD single
1. "Turn My Back on You" (extended re-mix) – 6:09
2. "Turn My Back on You" (Heff's mix) – 7:06
3. "Keep Looking" – 5:21

== Charts ==
Chart performance for "Turn My Back on You"
Chart (1989)	Peak position
US Hot R&B/Hip-Hop Songs (Billboard)	12
US Top R&B Singles (Cash Box)	13
