= The Big Unknown =

Single by Sade
- Released: 9 November 2018
- Genre: Soul
- Length: 4:21
- Label: PRS Ltd.
- Songwriter(s): Sade Adu; Ben Travers; Aaron Taylor Dean

Sade singles chronology
"Flower of the Universe" (2018)	"The Big Unknown" (2018)

Lyric video
- "The Big Unknown" on YouTube

"The Big Unknown" is a song by the English band Sade released in 2018. The song is featured in the motion picture Widows directed by Steve McQueen and centered on four women forced to pull off a robbery to pay a large criminal debt left behind by their late husbands. The film, which was adapted from the UK crime series of the same name, stars Viola Davis, Daniel Kaluuya, and Robert Duvall. Along with the songs by Sade and Nina Simone ("Wild Is the Wind"), the official soundtrack to Widows features an original score written by Hans Zimmer.

== Background ==
The song is Sade's second soundtrack contribution in 2018. Earlier that year, her song "Flower of the Universe" appeared in the Disney film A Wrinkle in Time. That tracks marked the singer's first new songs since 2011. According to a press release, director Steve McQueen had conversations with Sade about the movie and asked her to write a song about "loss and survival". In his interview to Los Angeles Times he stated that "Sade is an incomparable talent and incredible artist who so rarely releases new material, but luckily the original series of Widows had deeply resonated with her."

== Reception ==
Chris DeVille of Stereogum commented "The Big Unknown" [...] is a song that puts Sade's myriad imitators to shame—a minor-key ballad that manages to land some heavy emotional blows despite its impeccably tasteful lite production." Lars Gotrich of NPR wrote "But as Sade does, "The Big Unknown" bottles a sadness that is both overwhelming and resolute, determined to make the world right, but understands that grief forever breaks our bodies and souls."

Dominiq Robinson of AXS noted "[The song] radiates melancholy vibes as Sade's warm voice floats over slow-tempo piano chords and heavy bass. The drums appropriately take a backseat to the vocal and melody tracks allowing Sade to emote the somber lyrical content of one attempting to withdraw themselves from slipping into the depths of depression and mental anguish. The song intensifies throughout the chorus, with the help of clashing of cymbals, string progressions, electric guitar harmonies, and punchy piano melodies. Towards the end of the track, Sade displays her vocal range bringing the song to a beautiful climax before it ultimately ends back in a bleak atmosphere."

== Track listing ==
No.	Title	Writer(s)	Length
1.	"The Big Unknown"	Ben Travers, Sade Adu	4:21
