= Alex McDowell =

British narrative designer

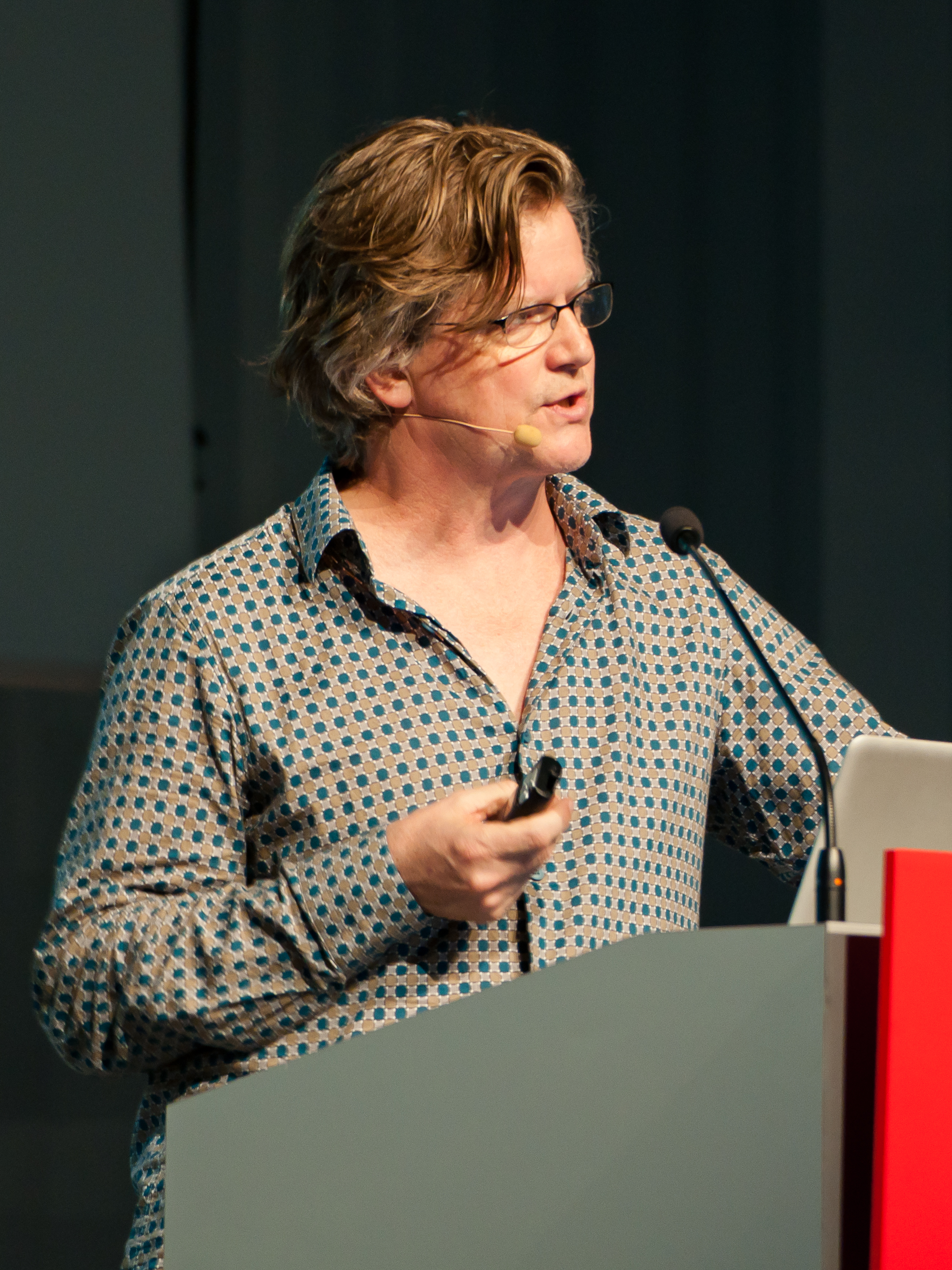
- Alex McDowell at FMX 2012
- Born: 11 April 1955 (age 71); Borneo, Malaysia
- Occupations: production designer, https://alexmcdowell.design/ creative director, professor of practice
- Years active: 1975–present
- Spouse: Kirsten Everberg
- Children: Oona Q K McDowell, Harper B McDowell

Alex McDowell RDI (born 11 April 1955) is a British production designer and creative director working in narrative media.

== Early work ==
Alex McDowell was born in Borneo, Malaysia, to British parents. His father, H Blair McDowell, was an engineer for Royal Dutch Shell, and his brother, Jonathan McDowell, is a London-based architect at Matter Architecture. He attended Quaker boarding schools in the UK from age 7 to 18.

McDowell studied fine art at the Central School of Art and Design in London. In 1975, he and Sebastian Conran staged the Sex Pistols’ first headline gig. He then designed and printed T-shirts for Malcolm McLaren and Vivienne Westwood's King's Road shop Sex. In 1978, he and musician Glen Matlock co-founded graphic studio Rocking Russian Design. McDowell designed album covers for punk rock groups and musicians, including Rich Kids, Siouxsie and the Banshees, The Clash, Athletico Spizz 80, and Iggy Pop.

In 1979, McDowell was commissioned to design Pop's Soldier album. He was production designer and producer of Iggy Pop's first music videos during that time. In 1981, he co-founded the design studio Da Gama, alongside typographer and designer John Warwicker. He began to work with director Tim Pope, designing a series of videos for The Cure. Pope and McDowell made a video with Depeche Mode at the Berlin Wall, with Queen in Munich, and Neil Young in California. In 1986, McDowell moved to Los Angeles.

During the late 1980s and 1990s, he designed the sets for music videos, including artists like Madonna, Michael Jackson, ZZ Top, Aerosmith, and others. He worked at Limelight, where he designed and directed music videos, including "Paradise" (1988) for British-Nigerian singer Sade. He later worked at Propaganda Films, designing sets for Madonna's videos "Express Yourself", "Oh Father", and "Vogue", and commercials for companies like Levi's, Converse, Nike, Pepsi, Revlon, Sony, Coca-Cola, and Chanel.

McDowell's first feature, The Lawnmower Man, was the first film to use virtual reality, with the advice of NASA consultant Scott Fisher . Following this, he designed The Crow (1994).

== Current work ==
McDowell is a Professor of Cinema Practice at the University of Southern California. McDowell was named the William Cameron Menzies Endowed Chair in Production Design in 2014. He directs the USC World Building Media Lab (WbML) and World Building Institute.

=== World Building Institute ===
In October 2008, McDowell founded the World Building Institute. From 2007 to 2016, the World Building Institute hosted the Science of Fiction Festival every 18 months. Founded on McDowell's principle of "design is a sharp knife', the event's purpose was to break down the silos in the media industries and to promote an integration of design, technology and science. Its audiences were cross-industry, multi-disciplined and complex and included high school children and corporate leaders. The World Building Institute has also hosted workshops and events including at the Berlin Film Festival and at the Berlinale Talents.

== Filmography ==
=== As Production Designer ===
Year	Title	Notes	Ref(s)
1992	The Lawnmower Man		
1994	The Crow		
1995	Crying Freeman	Alongside Douglas Higgins	
1996	Fear		
1996	The Crow: City of Angels		
1998	Fear and Loathing in Las Vegas		
1999	Fight Club		
2001	The Affair of the Necklace		
2002	Minority Report	"Production designed by"	
2003	The Cat in the Hat	"Production designed by"	
2004	The Terminal		
2005	Charlie and the Chocolate Factory		
2005	Corpse Bride	"Production designed by"	
2006	Breaking and Entering		
2007	Bee Movie		
2009	Watchmen		
2012	Upside Down		
2013	Man of Steel	Alongside Aaron Ragan-Fore (uncredited)	

=== As a Consultant ===
Year	Title	Roles	Notes	Ref(s)
2009	Fantastic Mr. Fox	Design Consultant		
2012	Rise of the Guardians	Visual Consultant		

=== As Co-Producer ===
Year	Title	Notes	Ref(s)
2010	Bunraku		

== Awards ==
In 2002, McDowell won a San Diego Film Critics Society award in the Best Production Design category for his work on Minority Report and, in 2004, an Art Directors Guild award for Excellence in Production Design for The Terminal. In 2006, McDowell was named Royal Designer for Industry by the RSA, a design society, and was appointed Visiting Artist at the MIT Media Lab. In April 2015, McDowell was awarded the BritWeek Business Innovation Award.
