= A Wrinkle in Time (soundtrack) =

A Wrinkle in Time (Original Motion Picture Soundtrack)

Soundtrack album by Ramin Djawadi
- Released: March 9, 2018
- Genres: Soundtrack; film score
- Label: Walt Disney
- Producer: Ava DuVernay

Ramin Djawadi chronology
The Mountain Between Us (2017)	A Wrinkle in Time (Original Motion Picture Soundtrack) (2018)	Slender Man (2018)

Singles from A Wrinkle in Time
- 1. "Flower of the Universe" Released: March 7, 2018; 2. "Warrior" Released: March 7, 2018; 3. "I Believe" Released: March 9, 2018

A Wrinkle in Time (Original Motion Picture Soundtrack) is the soundtrack album to the 2018 film of the same name. The soundtrack features seven original songs written for the film, as well as the film score by Ramin Djawadi. Walt Disney Records released the soundtrack digitally and on streaming platforms on March 9, 2018, and physically released it on CD on March 30.

== Track listing ==
No.	Title	Artist(s)	Length
1.	"Flower of the Universe" (No I.D. Remix)	Sade	4:07
2.	"I Believe"	DJ Khaled featuring Demi Lovato	3:45
3.	"Magic"	Sia	3:30
4.	"Let Me Live"	Kehlani	3:17
5.	"Warrior"	Chloe x Halle	3:40
6.	"Park Bench People"	Freestyle Fellowship	5:16
7.	"Flower of the Universe"	Sade	3:49
8.	"A Wrinkle in Time"	Ramin Djawadi	2:09
9.	"Mrs. Whatsit, Mrs. Who and Mrs. Which"	Ramin Djawadi	3:35
10.	"Darkness Across the Universe"	Ramin Djawadi	2:33
11.	"Touch the Stars"	Ramin Djawadi	1:44
12.	"Happy Medium"	Ramin Djawadi	2:05
13.	"Camazotz"	Ramin Djawadi	3:50
14.	"Home"	Ramin Djawadi	1:38
15.	"Uriel"	Ramin Djawadi	2:19
16.	"Is This a Dream?"	Ramin Djawadi	2:14
17.	"Forgive Me"	Ramin Djawadi	3:11
18.	"Be a Warrior"	Ramin Djawadi	5:00
19.	"Tap Into Your Mind"	Ramin Djawadi	3:01
20.	"Tesseract"	Ramin Djawadi	3:23
21.	"Sorry I'm Late"	Ramin Djawadi	6:09
22.	"The Universe Is Within All of Us"	Ramin Djawadi	2:10
Total length:			72:27

Track listing adapted from Complex.com

== Charts ==
Chart (2018)	Peak position
US Billboard Top Soundtrack Albums	10
