= Soldier of Love (album) =

2010 studio album by Sade

Studio album by Sade
- Released: 5 February 2010
- Recorded: 2009
- Studios: Real World (Box, England); El Cortijo (San Pedro de Alcántara, Spain)
- Genre: Pop-soul
- Length: 41:58
- Label: Epic
- Producers: Sade; Mike Pela

Sade chronology
Lovers Live (2002)	Soldier of Love (2010)	The Ultimate Collection (2011)

Singles from Soldier of Love
- 1. "Soldier of Love" Released: 8 December 2009; 2. "Babyfather" Released: 13 April 2010; 3. "The Moon and the Sky" Released: 24 August 2010

Soldier of Love is the sixth studio album by English band Sade, released on 5 February 2010 by Epic Records. Following the release of Lovers Rock (2000) and its subsequent tour, the band went onto hiatus for several years. In 2008, the band regrouped in order to begin work on their sixth album, making it the first time each member had been together. The recording of the album primarily took place at Real World Studios in Box, England, with additional sessions at El Cortijo in San Pedro de Alcántara, Spain. The album's recording began in 2009 and was completed in the summer of that year.

The album produced three singles. The first single "Soldier of Love" premiered on US radio on 8 December 2009, and was released digitally on 11 January 2010. Subsequent singles "Babyfather" and "The Moon and the Sky" were serviced to US urban AC radio on 13 April and 24 August 2010, respectively.

The album debuted at number four on the UK Albums Chart. It also debuted at number one on the Billboard 200 with first-week sales of 502,000 copies in the United States, marking Sade's first number-one debut on the chart in 25 years since 1985's Promise while also spending three weeks at the top of the chart. Upon its release, Soldier of Love received generally positive reviews from most music critics and won a Grammy Award for Best R&B Performance by a Duo or Group with Vocals. The band promoted the album with their first concert tour in 10 years, Sade Live.

== Background ==
Following an eight-year hiatus, Sade released their fifth studio album, Lovers Rock, in November 2000, which became a commercial success, selling 3.9 million copies in the United States by February 2010. To promote the album, the band embarked on their fifth concert tour, the Lovers Rock Tour. Following the release of Lovers Rock, the group took a 10-year hiatus. During this time, Sade made only one rare public appearance in 2002 to accept an Order of the British Empire (OBE) at Buckingham Palace for services to music. She then moved to rural Gloucestershire where, in 2005, she bought a run-down, stone-built cottage to renovate near Stroud. Sade stated that she was in no rush to release music and was not interested in releasing music just for the sake of selling a product.

== Recording ==
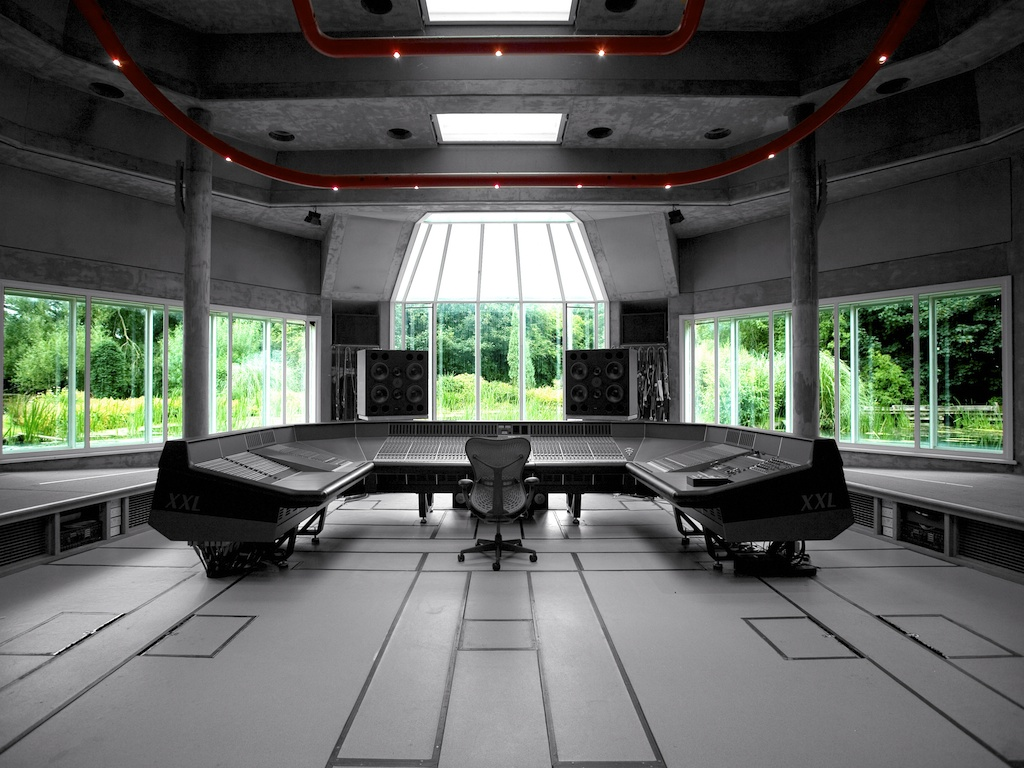
Real World Studios were one of the recording locations of the album

Following the hiatus, Sade began to collect ideas for studio sessions, and in 2008, a call was made by her asking for the band to regroup and begin to record. Afterwards, the band met up and began recording at Peter Gabriel's Real World Studios. It was the first time the four members had met up since the Lovers Rock Tour concluded in 2001. Bassist Paul Denman decamped from Los Angeles, where he had been managing his teenage son's punk band, Orange. Guitarist and saxophonist Stuart Matthewman interrupted his film soundtrack work in New York, and keyboardist Andrew Hale gave up his A&R consultancy.

According to Billboard, the band had been working on the album throughout June 2009. At that time, Sony Music had not set a release date, but it hoped to put the record out by the end of 2009. "She is in the studio and the album will come when it is ready", a source at Sony Music told Billboard. "You don't wait for years for one and then rush it." In a series of sessions at Real World, Sade sketched out the material for a new album which, they all felt, was shaping up to be their most ambitious.

Hale said, "The big question for all of us at the beginning was, 'Did we still want to do this and could we still get along as friends?' She's never, ever seemed to doubt what it was she wanted. You feel like you're all on this quest that's always been in the back of her mind. She's got more stamina than the rest of us." In March 2009, American singer Maxwell, a fellow Sony Music recording artist and longtime friend and collaborator with Stuart Matthewman, sent a message to fans via his private Facebook page in which he indicated that he had heard some of Sade's new recordings, saying, "Trust me, it's so monolithic it'll shake you in your shoes!" Denman stated that because each member of the band lived on different continents and did not bring any completed songs into the studio, the writing and recording process took a long time. The album was completed in the summer of 2009, mainly at Real World studios. The cover art for the album was taken by Sophie Muller in the Zapotec ruins of Monte Albán, Mexico.

== Release and promotion ==
In April 2011, the band began their Sade Live tour (also known as the Once in a Lifetime Tour or the Soldier of Love Tour). The tour visited Europe, the Americas, Australia and Asia in support of Soldier of Love, as well as the band's second compilation album, The Ultimate Collection. This trek marked the band's first tour in nearly a decade. The tour ranked 27th on Pollstar's "Top 50 Worldwide Tour (Mid-Year)", earning over $20 million. In late 2011, the tour placed 10th on Billboard's annual "Top 25 Tours" list, earning over $53.1 million with 59 shows.

== Critical reception ==
Professional ratings
Aggregate scores
Source	Rating
AnyDecentMusic?	6.5/10
Metacritic	79/100
Review scores
Source	Rating
AllMusic	3/5 stars
The A.V. Club	A−
Chicago Tribune	3/4 stars
Entertainment Weekly	A
The Guardian	3/5 stars
Los Angeles Times	3.5/4 stars
Pitchfork	7.0/10
Q	4/5 stars
Rolling Stone	3.5/5 stars
Slant Magazine	3.5/5 stars

Soldier of Love received generally positive reviews from music critics. At Metacritic, which assigns a normalised rating out of 100 to reviews from mainstream publications, the album received an average score of 79, based on 19 reviews, indicating "generally favorable reviews". At AnyDecentMusic?, that collates critical reviews from more than 50 media sources, the album scored 6.5 points out of 10, based on 18 reviews.

Chicago Tribune writer Greg Kot wrote favorably of Sade Adu's singing, stating "she remains alluring and subtly rewarding, while still keeping the listener at a safe distance, as if she had even deeper secrets to guard." The Daily Telegraph's Tom Horan gave the album five stars and commented that its songs are "beautifully balanced between warmth and toughness, vulnerability and hauteur." The Observer's Kitty Empire called it a "triumph for quality over quantity." Jim DeRogatis of the Chicago Sun-Times gave the album three out of four stars and complimented its "sophisticated and soulful grooves", stating, "Sade may not be giving us anything radically new, but it's a pleasure just to have her back doing what she's always done so well." Stephen M. Duesner of Paste called it Sade's "most musically adventurous collection to date, and also its most expansive and rewarding". Nathan Rabin of The A.V. Club felt that the album "benefits from a divine sense of intimacy; Sade seems to be whispering secret thoughts directly into the listener's ears." Benjamin Boles of Now wrote that its production "sounds a bit tougher and chunkier than the band's early work, but the classic Sade vibe we love is still front and centre."

In a mixed review, AllMusic's Andy Kellman felt that the album's lyrical themes are bleak, writing that "a fair portion ... comes off as drained-sounding, only echoed with vanilla arrangements that are merely functional". Peter Paphides of The Times perceived a lack of "catchy tracks" as a weakness and called it "an album bordering upon ambient in its statuesque stillness". The Guardian writer Caroline Sullivan was ambivalent towards the group's "pop-soul" and "quiet storm" style on the album, but added that the "lushness and understatement" is balanced by "lyrics of surprising transparency". Despite calling its mood "morose" and expressing a mixed response towards its "bleakness and melancholy", All About Jazz critic Jeff Winbush viewed Soldier of Love as an improvement over Sade's previous album, Lovers Rock. MSN Music's Robert Christgau gave the album a one-star honorable mention, citing "Babyfather" and the title track as highlights, and quipped, "I'm glad she finally put some beats on her sang-froid, but by the time she gets around to setting Ghost up with a 16 he'll probably be out of the life."

At the 53rd Annual Grammy Awards in 2011, the title track won Best R&B Performance by a Duo or Group with Vocals, while the song "Babyfather" was nominated for Best Pop Performance by a Duo or Group with Vocals.

== Commercial performance ==
Soldier of Love debuted at number four on the UK Albums Chart, selling 42,997 copies in its first week. It had sold 116,672 copies in the United Kingdom by May 2011, and was certified gold by the British Phonographic Industry (BPI) on 22 July 2013. The album debuted atop the Billboard 200 in the United States with first-week sales of 502,000 copies, becoming Sade's first number-one debut and second number-one album on the chart, as well as the best sales week for an album by a group since AC/DC's Black Ice entered the Billboard 200 at number one in November 2008 with 784,000 copies sold. It remained at number one for three consecutive weeks, selling 190,000 copies in its second week and 127,000 copies in its third. The album was certified platinum by the Recording Industry Association of America (RIAA) within one month of its release, on 15 March 2010, and as of April 2011, it had sold 1.3 million copies in the US.

The album debuted at number one on the Canadian Albums Chart with first-week sales of under 20,000 units, spending three consecutive weeks atop the chart. The Canadian Recording Industry Association (CRIA) certified the album platinum on 24 March 2010, denoting shipments in excess of 80,000 copies. In France, Soldier of Love sold 18,986 copies to enter the French Albums Chart at number one. The album topped the charts in several other countries, including Belgium (Wallonia), Croatia, Czech Republic, Hungary, Italy, Poland, Portugal, Spain, Sweden and Switzerland, while peaking at number one on Billboard's European Top 100 Albums for four consecutive weeks. Soldier of Love had sold 2.3 million copies outside the UK by the end of 2010, becoming that year's second best-selling album worldwide by a British artist, behind Susan Boyle's The Gift.

== Track listing ==
All lyrics are written by Sade Adu.

No.	Title	Music	Length
1.	"The Moon and the Sky"	Adu; Stuart Matthewman; Andrew Hale	4:28
2.	"Soldier of Love"	Adu; Matthewman; Hale; Paul Denman	5:59
3.	"Morning Bird"	Adu; Matthewman; Hale	3:55
4.	"Babyfather"	Adu; Matthewman; Juan Janes; Andrew Nicholls	4:40
5.	"Long Hard Road"	Adu; Janes; Nicholls	3:03
6.	"Be That Easy"	Adu; Matthewman	3:41
7.	"Bring Me Home"	Adu; Matthewman; Hale	4:09
8.	"In Another Time"	Adu; Matthewman; Hale	5:06
9.	"Skin"	Adu; Matthewman; Hale; Denman	4:13
10.	"The Safest Place"	Adu; Hale	2:46
Total length:			41:58

== Personnel ==
Credits adapted from the liner notes of Soldier of Love.

=== Sade ===
- Sade Adu – vocals, programming
- Stuart Matthewman – guitar, saxophone, programming
- Andrew Hale – keyboards, programming
- Paul S. Denman – bass

=== Additional musicians ===
- Tony Momrelle – vocals
- Leroy Osbourne – vocals
- Martin Ditcham – percussion, drums
- Pete Lewinson – drums
- Everton Nelson – violin
- Ian Burdge – cello
- Gordon Matthewman – trumpet
- Noel Langley – trumpet
- Ila Adu – vocals (track 4)
- Clay Matthewman – vocals (track 4)
- Juan Janes – guitar (track 5)
- Sophie Muller – ukulele

=== Technical ===
- Sade – production
- Mike Pela – co-production, engineering (all tracks); mixing (tracks 2, 3, 5–7, 9, 10)
- Mark "Spike" Stent – mixing (tracks 1, 4)
- Michael Brauer – mixing (track 8)
- Andrew Nicholls – additional pre-production engineering (tracks 4, 5)
- John Davis – mastering

=== Artwork ===
- Sophie Muller – photography, art direction
- Tom Hingston Studio – design

== Charts ==
=== Weekly charts ===
Weekly chart performance for Soldier of Love
Chart (2010)	Peak position
Australian Albums (ARIA)	4
Austrian Albums (Ö3 Austria)	2
Belgian Albums (Ultratop Flanders)	5
Belgian Albums (Ultratop Wallonia)	1
Brazilian Albums (ABPD)	7
Canadian Albums (Billboard)	1
Croatian Albums (HDU)	1
Czech Albums (ČNS IFPI)	1
Danish Albums (Hitlisten)	4
Dutch Albums (Album Top 100)	2
European Albums (Billboard)	1
Finnish Albums (Suomen virallinen lista)	9
French Albums (SNEP)	1
German Albums (Offizielle Top 100)	2
Greek International Albums (IFPI)	1
Hungarian Albums (MAHASZ)	1
Irish Albums (IRMA)	12
Italian Albums (FIMI)	1
Japanese Albums (Oricon)	13
Mexican Albums (Top 100 Mexico)	35
New Zealand Albums (RMNZ)	3
Norwegian Albums (VG-lista)	7
Polish Albums (ZPAV)	1
Portuguese Albums (AFP)	1
Russian Albums (2M)	3
Scottish Albums (Official Charts)	10
South African Albums (RISA)	4
South Korean Albums (Gaon)	15
Spanish Albums (Promusicae)	1
Swedish Albums (Sverigetopplistan)	1
Swiss Albums (Schweizer Hitparade)	1
UK Albums (Official Charts)	4
US Billboard 200	1
US Top R&B/Hip-Hop Albums (Billboard)	1

=== Year-end charts ===
2010 year-end chart performance for Soldier of Love
Chart (2010)	Position
Austrian Albums (Ö3 Austria)	37
Belgian Albums (Ultratop Flanders)	50
Belgian Albums (Ultratop Wallonia)	5
Canadian Albums (Billboard)	38
Danish Albums (Hitlisten)	58
Dutch Albums (Album Top 100)	49
European Albums (Billboard)	12
Finnish Albums (Suomen virallinen lista)	28
French Albums (SNEP)	18
German Albums (Offizielle Top 100)	43
Hungarian Albums (MAHASZ)	10
Italian Albums (FIMI)	46
Polish Albums (ZPAV)	1
Russian Albums (2M)	9
Spanish Albums (PROMUSICAE)	33
Swedish Albums (Sverigetopplistan)	14
Swedish Albums & Compilations (Sverigetopplistan)	17
Swiss Albums (Schweizer Hitparade)	15
UK Albums (OCC)	123
US Billboard 200	14
US Top R&B/Hip-Hop Albums (Billboard)	4

2011 year-end chart performance for Soldier of Love
Chart (2011)	Position
French Albums (SNEP)	196
Polish Albums (ZPAV)	94
US Top R&B/Hip-Hop Albums (Billboard)	86

=== Decade-end charts ===
Decade-end chart performance for Soldier of Love
Chart (2010–2019)	Position
US Billboard 200	175

== Certifications and sales ==
Certifications and sales for Soldier of Love
Region	Certification	Certified units/sales
Austria (IFPI Austria)	Gold	10,000^{*}
Belgium (BRMA)	Gold	15,000^{*}
Brazil (Pro-Música Brasil)	Gold	20,000^{*}
Canada (Music Canada)	Platinum	80,000^{^}
Finland (Musiikkituottajat)	Gold	13,304
France (SNEP)	2× Platinum	200,000^{*}
Germany (BVMI)	Platinum	200,000^{‡}
Greece (IFPI Greece)	Platinum	6,000^{^}
Hungary (MAHASZ)	2× Platinum	12,000^{^}
Italy (FIMI)	Gold	30,000^{*}
Netherlands (NVPI)	Gold	25,000^{^}
Poland (ZPAV)	Diamond	100,000^{*}
Russia (NFPF)	2× Platinum	20,000^{*}
Sweden (GLF)	Gold	20,000^{‡}
Switzerland (IFPI Switzerland)	Platinum	30,000^{^}
United Kingdom (BPI)	Gold	116,672
United States (RIAA)	Platinum	1,300,000
Summaries
Worldwide	—	2,300,000
^{*} Sales figures based on certification alone.^{^} Shipments figures based on certification alone.^{‡} Sales+streaming figures based on certification alone.

== Release history ==
Release dates and formats for Soldier of Love
Region	Date	Format	Label	Ref(s)
Germany	5 February 2010	CD; digital download	Sony	
France	5 February 2010	Digital download	Sony	
France	8 February 2010	CD	Sony	
United Kingdom	8 February 2010	CD; digital download	RCA	
Canada	9 February 2010	CD; digital download	Sony	
United States	9 February 2010	CD; digital download	Epic	
Australia	12 February 2010	CD; digital download	Sony	
Japan	3 March 2010	CD; digital download	Sony	
Germany	19 March 2010	LP	Sony	
United Kingdom	25 October 2010	LP	Music on Vinyl	

== See also ==
- List of Billboard 200 number-one albums of 2010
- List of Billboard number-one R&B albums of 2010
- List of European number-one hits of 2010
- List of number-one albums of 2010 (Canada)
- List of number-one albums of 2010 (Poland)
- List of number-one albums of 2010 (Spain)
- List of number-one hits of 2010 (France)
- List of number-one hits of 2010 (Italy)
- List of number-one hits of 2010 (Switzerland)
