= Nothing Can Come Between Us =

Single by Sade

from the album Stronger Than Pride
- B-side: "Make Some Room"; "You're Not the Man"
- Released: 15 August 1988
- Genre: R&B; soul; disco-funk
- Length: 4:21 (album version); 3:52 (single version)
- Label: Epic
- Composer(s): Sade Adu; Stuart Matthewman; Andrew Hale
- Lyricist(s): Sade Adu
- Producer(s): Sade

Sade singles chronology
"Paradise" (1988)	"Nothing Can Come Between Us" (1988)	"Turn My Back on You" (1988)

Music video
- "Nothing Can Come Between Us" on YouTube

"Nothing Can Come Between Us" is a song by English band Sade from their third studio album, Stronger Than Pride (1988). It was released as the album's third single on 15 August 1988 by Epic, reaching number 92 on the UK Singles Chart and number three on the US Billboard Hot R&B/Hip-Hop Songs chart.

== Critical reception ==
Pan-European magazine Music & Media described "Nothing Can Come Between Us" as "another brooding, percussion-oriented track in a velvety production. Just typical Sade." Ben Thompson from NME felt the band comes in a "rugged and windswept vein" on the song, "a disappointment after the surprisingly energetic 'Paradise'." Frank Guan of Vulture stated, "Truer words have never been sung than In the middle of the madness, hold on. Stuart Matthewman's best impression of funk guitar adds just the right amount of spice to the duet."

== Track listings ==
- 7-inch single

A. "Nothing Can Come Between Us" – 3:55
B. "Make Some Room" – 3:24

- 12-inch single

A. "Nothing Can Come Between Us" – 4:21
B. "Make Some Room" (extended version) – 5:00

- UK limited-edition gatefold 12-inch single

A. "Nothing Can Come Between Us" – 4:21
B1. "Make Some Room" (extended version) – 5:00
B2. "You're Not the Man" – 5:09

- UK CD single
1. "Nothing Can Come Between Us" – 4:21
2. "Make Some Room" (extended version) – 5:00
3. "You're Not the Man" – 5:09
- US cassette single
1. "Nothing Can Come Between Us"
2. "Make Some Room"

== Charts ==
=== Weekly charts ===
Weekly chart performance for "Nothing Can Come Between Us"
Chart (1988)	Peak position
Netherlands (Single Top 100)	89
UK Singles (OCC)	92
US Adult Contemporary (Billboard)	21
US Hot R&B/Hip-Hop Songs (Billboard)	3
US Top Black Contemporary Singles (Cash Box)	2

=== Year-end charts ===
Year-end chart performance for "Nothing Can Come Between Us"
Chart (1988)	Position
US Hot R&B/Hip-Hop Songs (Billboard)	90
