= Stronger Than Pride =

1988 studio album by Sade

Studio album by Sade
- Released: 3 May 1988
- Recorded: 1987–1988
- Studios: Compass Point (Nassau, Bahamas); Miraval (Le Val, France); Marcadet (Paris)
- Genres: Soul; funk
- Length: 47:07
- Label: Epic
- Producer: Sade

Sade chronology
Promise (1985)	Stronger Than Pride (1988)	Love Deluxe (1992)

Singles from Stronger Than Pride
- 1. "Love Is Stronger Than Pride" Released: March 1988; 2. "Paradise" Released: May 1988; 3. "Nothing Can Come Between Us" Released: August 1988; 4. "Turn My Back on You" Released: November 1988; 5. "Haunt Me" Released: February 1989

Stronger Than Pride is the third studio album by English band Sade, released by Epic Records in the United Kingdom on 3 May 1988 and in the United States on 10 May 1988. Stronger Than Pride was the band's first album to be self-produced. The album spawned five singles and was a commercial success, achieving top-10 chart peaks in several countries worldwide.

== Development ==
Around the time Stronger Than Pride was released, Sade Adu commented on its production: "I wanted it to be more basic and less embellished, with the quiet songs quieter and the harder songs harder." Speaking to The New York Times, she added, "I wanted a sound that was empty and hollow so that you would have the voice just coming at you."

Songwriting sessions for the album happened in Spain and London, and then recording sessions took place in France and the Bahamas over the course of a year. Stuart Matthewman, the band's guitarist and saxophonist, said Stronger Than Pride was the first time Sade composed songs piecemeal and not as a collective. Sade self-produced the album following collaborator Robin Millar going blind amidst the recording of the band's previous album Promise (1985).

== Composition ==
Pitchfork writer Stephen Kearse noted "while Sade doesn't reinvent itself on Stronger Than Pride, it does unwind." Rolling Stone's Rob Tannenbaum described the album's music as a mixture of "brisk urban tracks" and "acoustic material inspired by Brazilian bossa nova". Track one, "Love Is Stronger Than Pride", features keys, percussion, and flutes. The drumless "Haunt Me", track four, has been described as "lush" and "amorphous". "Keep Looking" and "Give It Up", tracks six and eight, are groove-driven songs.

== Critical reception ==
Professional ratings
Review scores
Source	Rating
AllMusic	3.5/5 stars
Los Angeles Times	3/4 stars
NME	8/10
Number One	4/5 stars
Pitchfork	8.2/10
Q	3/5 stars
Rolling Stone	2/5 stars
The Rolling Stone Album Guide	3/5 stars
Smash Hits	7/10
The Village Voice	B−

Los Angeles Times critic Kristine McKenna wrote, "The nine songs on Stronger Than Pride add up to one long plea of desire, and as the album makes its way up the charts—as it surely will—armies of love-struck men will no doubt dream of losing themselves in Sade's quiet storm of passion." Robert Christgau penned a mixed review in The Village Voice, saying, "I'm glad this self-made aristocrat has a human side, but I prefer her image: now that she's singing billets-doux, she's even further from rewarding the concentration she warrants than she used to be. Touching your beloved with a few true cliches is hard enough. For an audience you have to come up with something that doesn't fade into the background like the new age jazz she went pop with."

In a retrospective review, AllMusic's Ron Wynn commented that "Sade demonstrated some intensity and fire on her third release. Whether that was just an attempt to change the pace a bit or a genuine new direction, she had more animation in her delivery on such songs as 'Haunt Me,' 'Give It Up,' and the hit 'Paradise.' Not that she was suddenly singing in a soulful or bluesy manner; rather, Sade's dry and introspective tone now had a little more edge, and the lyrics were ironic as well as reflective."

In 2018, Pitchfork placed Stronger Than Pride at number 37 on its list of "The 200 Best Albums of the 1980s".

== Track listing ==
All lyrics are written by Sade Adu, except "Siempre Hay Esperanza".

No.	Title	Music	Length
1.	"Love Is Stronger Than Pride"	Adu; Andrew Hale; Stuart Matthewman	4:16
2.	"Paradise"	Adu; Hale; Matthewman; Paul S. Denman	4:01
3.	"Nothing Can Come Between Us"	Adu; Matthewman; Hale	4:21
4.	"Haunt Me"	Adu; Matthewman	5:48
5.	"Turn My Back on You"	Adu; Hale; Matthewman	6:05
6.	"Keep Looking"	Adu; Hale	5:20
7.	"Clean Heart"	Adu; Matthewman; Hale	3:59
8.	"Give It Up"	Adu; Matthewman; Hale	3:49
9.	"I Never Thought I'd See the Day"	Adu; Leroy Osbourne	4:12
10.	"Siempre Hay Esperanza"	Matthewman; Adu; Osbourne	5:16
Total length:			47:07

== Personnel ==
Credits adapted from the liner notes of Stronger Than Pride.

=== Sade ===
- Stuart Matthewman – guitars, saxophone
- Sade Adu – vocals
- Andrew Hale – keyboards
- Paul S. Denman – bass
- Sade – arrangements

=== Additional personnel ===
- Leroy Osbourne – vocals
- Martin Ditcham – drums, percussion
- James McMillan – trumpet
- Jake Jacas – trombone
- Gordon Hunte – guitar (tracks 2, 8)
- Nick Ingman – string arrangements (tracks 4, 9)
- Gavyn Wright – solo violin (track 4)

=== Technical ===
- Sade – production
- Mike Pela – engineering, co-production
- Ben Rogan – engineering, co-production
- Melanie West – engineering assistance
- Vince McCartney – engineering assistance
- Franck Segarra – engineering assistance
- Olivier de Bosson – engineering assistance
- Alain Lubrano – engineering assistance
- Jean-Christophe Vareille – engineering assistance
- Herb Powers Jr. – mastering at Frankford/Wayne Mastering Labs (New York City)

=== Artwork ===
- Levon Parian – cover photograph
- Toshi Yajima – inner photograph
- Graham Smith – design

== Charts ==
=== Weekly charts ===
Weekly chart performance for Stronger Than Pride
Chart (1988)	Peak position
Australian Albums (Australian Music Report)	11
Austrian Albums (Ö3 Austria)	6
Canada Top Albums/CDs (RPM)	9
Dutch Albums (Album Top 100)	1
European Albums (Music & Media)	1
Finnish Albums (Suomen virallinen lista)	3
French Albums (IFOP)	4
German Albums (Offizielle Top 100)	4
Italian Albums (Musica e dischi)	1
Japanese Albums (Oricon)	8
New Zealand Albums (RMNZ)	8
Norwegian Albums (VG-lista)	7
Spanish Albums (AFYVE)	9
Swedish Albums (Sverigetopplistan)	2
Swiss Albums (Schweizer Hitparade)	2
UK Albums (Official Charts)	3
US Billboard 200	7
US Top Contemporary Jazz Albums (Billboard)	21
US Top R&B/Hip-Hop Albums (Billboard)	3

2024 weekly chart performance for Stronger Than Pride
Chart (2024)	Peak position
Portuguese Albums (AFP)	163

=== Year-end charts ===
Year-end chart performance for Stronger Than Pride
Chart (1988)	Position
Australian Albums (Australian Music Report)	62
Austrian Albums (Ö3 Austria)	18
Canada Top Albums/CDs (RPM)	46
Dutch Albums (Album Top 100)	22
European Albums (Music & Media)	8
German Albums (Offizielle Top 100)	17
Swiss Albums (Schweizer Hitparade)	17
UK Albums (Gallup)	51
US Billboard 200	37
US Top R&B/Hip-Hop Albums (Billboard)	26

== Certifications ==
Certifications for Stronger Than Pride
Region	Certification	Certified units/sales
Canada (Music Canada)	Platinum	100,000^{^}
France (SNEP)	2× Platinum	600,000^{*}
Germany (BVMI)	Gold	250,000^{^}
Netherlands (NVPI)	Platinum	100,000^{^}
New Zealand (RMNZ)	Gold	7,500^{^}
Spain (Promusicae)	Platinum	100,000^{^}
Switzerland (IFPI Switzerland)	Platinum	50,000^{^}
United Kingdom (BPI)	Platinum	300,000^{^}
United States (RIAA)	3× Platinum	3,500,000
^{*} Sales figures based on certification alone.^{^} Shipments figures based on certification alone.

== See also ==
- List of European number-one hits of 1988
