= Love Is Stronger Than Pride (Sade song) =

Single by Sade

from the album Stronger Than Pride
- B-side: "Super Bien Total"; "Make Some Room"
- Released: 21 March 1988
- Genre: Quiet storm; smooth jazz
- Length: 4:18
- Label: Epic
- Composers: Sade Adu; Andrew Hale; Stuart Matthewman
- Lyricist: Sade Adu
- Producer: Sade

Sade singles chronology
"Never as Good as the First Time" (1986)	"Love Is Stronger Than Pride" (1988)	"Paradise" (1988)

Music video
- "Love Is Stronger Than Pride" on YouTube

"Love Is Stronger Than Pride" is a song by English band Sade from their third studio album, Stronger Than Pride (1988). It was released as the album's lead single on 21 March 1988 by Epic. The song was a top 10 hit in Finland and Italy, and entered the top 20 in Belgium, the Netherlands and South Africa. In the UK, it peaked at number 44.

== Reception ==
In 2012, Sophie Heawood of The Guardian commented, "Seemingly composed entirely from air currents and fragments of Spanish guitar, the lead single from the 1988 album of the same name showed Sade at their most minimal". Upon the release, Neil Taylor from NME said, "The woman has stuck to the same weepy formula that justifiably endeared her to the hearts and centrefolds of rock crits the world over. Ms Adu sticks to the same small group of emotions — love, pride, fear of loss — and true to form this single is one more thwarted-love song. Sade's voice is perfect, and the production is subtle and suitably suave."

James Hamilton from Record Mirror wrote in his dance column, "Resonantly atmospheric pulsing though not very rhythmic 43 3/4-0bpm smoky slow vocal swayer". Frank Guan of Vulture noted in a 2017 retrospective review, "There's a bit of an in-joke in the title track of Sade's third album: prior to renaming itself after, and reorganizing itself around its lead singer, the band had played under the name of Pride. Complete the equation and you'll discover that Sade is, in fact, Love, a fact amply borne out by the song itself."

== Track listings ==
- 7-inch single

A. "Love Is Stronger Than Pride" – 4:18
B. "Super Bien Total" – 4:02

- 12-inch single

A. "Love Is Stronger Than Pride" – 4:18
B. "Super Bien Total" (extended mix) – 6:52

- UK and European CD single
- Austrian 3-inch CD single
1. "Love Is Stronger Than Pride" – 4:18
2. "Super Bien Total" (extended mix) – 6:52
- US cassette single
1. "Love Is Stronger Than Pride" – 4:18
2. "Make Some Room" – 4:16

== Charts ==
Weekly chart performance for "Love Is Stronger Than Pride"
Chart (1988)	Peak position
Australia (Kent Music Report)	56
Belgium (Ultratop 50 Flanders)	11
Finland (Suomen virallinen lista)	5
France (SNEP)	36
Ireland (IRMA)	28
Italy (Musica e dischi)	4
Italy Airplay (Music & Media)	10
Netherlands (Dutch Top 40)	18
Netherlands (Single Top 100)	19
South Africa (Springbok Radio)	20
UK Singles (Official Charts)	44
West Germany (GfK)	51
