= Babyfather (song) =

Single by Sade

from the album Soldier of Love
- Released: 13 April 2010
- Recorded: 2009
- Genre: Reggae fusion; lovers rock
- Length: 4:40
- Label: Sony
- Songwriter(s): Sade Adu; Stuart Matthewman; Juan Janes; Andrew Nichols
- Producer(s): Sade Adu

Sade singles chronology
"Soldier of Love" (2010)	"Babyfather" (2010)	"The Moon and the Sky" (2010)

Music video
- "Babyfather" on YouTube

"Babyfather" is the second single from English band Sade on their sixth studio album, Soldier of Love. The song was released for radio broadcast on 13 April 2010, single artwork was revealed on 27 April, and a music video premiered on 4 May. The song was nominated in the Best Pop Performance by a Duo or Group with Vocal category at the 53rd Grammy Awards.

== Background and writing ==
In this reggae-flavoured song, Adu sings of a male figure who can be the father of a woman's child and a strong male role model, without necessarily being a lifemate. Frontwoman Sade Adu told People that "Babyfather," is "about how great it is to be a parent, what a great honor and privilege that is, and what a terrible thing that is to waste. As long as you feel good about yourself, you can be a good parent, and then it becomes an endless fruitful cycle". As for the sound of the new song, "I wanted it to sound quite rough and scrappy, not too honed," says the Grammy-winning singer, 51. "The beginning," says Sade, "feels like the ice cream van coming down the street".

Thirteen years old at the time, Sade Adu's child sang backing vocals on the track, along with Clay, the teenage son of veteran Sade band-member Stuart Matthewman, who co-wrote the song. Sade’s child later transitioned to male and took the name Izaak.

== Reception ==
A preview of the song was teased online by People in late January 2010, before the album was released. Entertainment reporter Mayer Nassim from Digital Spy gave the song three out of five stars and said, "'Babyfather' it's not as striking as its sultry predecessor, possessing a much friendlier, summery vibe. Twanging acoustic guitars combine with that still-rich voice, so-laidback-they're-horizontal drums and positive lyrics about fatherhood and family love. It's not the most exciting thing to hit our ears this year, but it's still nice enough stuff that should keep things ticking on for Sade fans". Frank Guan of Vulture commented "The sunnier side of Soldier of Love is on glorious display here, as Sade describes to a child how its parents first met. Some dads are good dads."

== Music video ==
The music video, which featured people wearing bright-coloured outfits, is directed by Sophie Muller, who also photographed and designed the single's cover art. It premiered on 4 May 2010 and featured frontwoman Adu as a home-maker who is doing daily chores from cooking to washing dishes and laundry.

== Promotion ==
The band performed the song on many talk shows. They appeared on The Tonight Show with Jay Leno on 12 April 2010, Dancing with the Stars on 14 April and The Late Late Show with Craig Ferguson the next day.

== Charts ==
Chart performance for "Babyfather"
Chart (2010)	Peak position
US Hot R&B/Hip-Hop Songs (Billboard)	53
US Smooth Jazz Airplay (Billboard)	10
