= The Moon and the Sky =

Single by Sade

from the album Soldier of Love
- Released: 24 August 2010
- Genre: Soul
- Length: 4:28
- Label: Epic
- Songwriter(s): Sade Adu; Stuart Matthewman; Andrew Hale

Sade singles chronology
"Babyfather" (2010)	"The Moon and the Sky" (2010)	"Still in Love with You" (2011)

Audio
- "The Moon and the Sky" on YouTube

"The Moon and the Sky" is the third single from English band Sade on their sixth studio album, Soldier of Love. It was released on 24 August 2010.

== Reception ==
Frank Guan of Vulture commented "Not even Sade can make the most of every opportunity, as this lofty song proves. Paired with a sad, introverted guitar line, her regret is impossible to mistake."

== Charts ==
Chart performance for "The Moon and the Sky"
Chart (2010)	Peak position
US Hot R&B/Hip-Hop Songs (Billboard)	54
US Smooth Jazz Airplay (Billboard)	11
