= Paradise (Sade song) =

Single by Sade

from the album Stronger Than Pride
- B-side: "Keep Hangin' On"
- Released: May 1988
- Recorded: 1987
- Genre: Sophisti-pop
- Length: 4:02 (album version); 3:37 (single version)
- Label: Epic
- Composers: Sade Adu; Andrew Hale; Stuart Matthewman; Paul S. Denman
- Lyricist: Sade Adu
- Producer: Sade

Sade singles chronology
"Love Is Stronger Than Pride" (1988)	"Paradise" (1988)	"Nothing Can Come Between Us" (1988)

Music video
- "Paradise" on YouTube

"Paradise" is a song by the English band Sade from their third studio album, Stronger Than Pride (1988). It was released in May 1988 by Epic as the album's second single. In the band's native UK, the single peaked at no. 29, and was the only single from the album to reach the Top 40. It is Sade's most successful track on the US Billboard Hot R&B/Hip-Hop Songs chart, peaking at number one for one week. The single also reached number 16 on the Billboard Hot 100 and number 21 on the Billboard Dance Club Songs chart. The music video for the single was directed by Alex McDowell. "Paradise" is often considered one of the band's signature songs, alongside "Smooth Operator" (1984), "The Sweetest Taboo" (1985), and "No Ordinary Love" (1992).

== Composition ==
"Paradise" is written in the key of F minor in common time with a tempo of 102 beats per minute. Adu's vocals span from F_{3} to A♭_{4}.

== Critical reception ==
The song was described as "swaggering" and "sinewy" by Lloyd Bradley of BBC Music. Pan-European magazine Music & Media viewed it as a "brooding, percussion-orientated, summery track. Highly swinging through its persistent, up-tempo, although at the same time somehow restrained, groove." John Tague from NME said, "...well, 'Paradise' is no different to any other song she's done in the last four years, as coolly sculpted as her features and about as engaging as an average Daily Telegraph leader." Frank Guan of Vulture commented, "Any song titled 'Paradise' had better sound like it, and her version doesn't disappoint – in fact, no song better expresses the phase of love where disappointment is impossible."

== Music video ==
Released in June 1988 and directed by British narrative designer and creative director Alex McDowell, the accompanying music video for "Paradise" features Sade joining in a celebration in a Mexican village and dancing with a young girl.

== Track listings ==
- 7-inch single

A. "Paradise" (remix) – 3:35
B. "Paradise" (instrumental) – 4:00

- 12-inch single

A. "Paradise" (extended remix) – 5:33
B1. "Paradise" (extended instrumental) – 4:01
B2. "Paradise" (extra beats) – 2:11

- UK and European CD single
1. "Paradise" (extended version) – 5:30
2. "Hang On to Your Love" (US remix) – 5:13
3. "Keep Hangin' On" (live) – 2:59
4. "Paradise" (instrumental) – 4:02
- US mini CD single
1. "Paradise" (remix) – 3:35
2. "Super Bien Total" – 4:03
- Japanese mini CD single
1. "Paradise" (remix) – 3:39
2. "Paradise" (instrumental) – 4:03

== Charts ==
=== Weekly charts ===
Weekly chart performance for "Paradise"
Chart (1988)	Peak position
Australia (ARIA)	86
Belgium (Ultratop 50 Flanders)	28
Canada Top Singles (RPM)	18
Canada Adult Contemporary (RPM)	1
Finland (Suomen virallinen lista)	28
France (SNEP)	38
Italy (Musica e dischi)	19
Italy Airplay (Music & Media)	15
Netherlands (Dutch Top 40)	26
Netherlands (Single Top 100)	33
UK Singles (OCC)	29
US Billboard Hot 100	16
US Adult Contemporary (Billboard)	3
US Dance Club Songs (Billboard)	21
US Dance Singles Sales (Billboard)	44
US Hot R&B/Hip-Hop Songs (Billboard)	1
US Cash Box Top 100	20
US Top Black Contemporary Singles (Cash Box)	1

=== Year-end charts ===
Year-end chart performance for "Paradise"
Chart (1988)	Position
US Adult Contemporary (Billboard)	43
US Hot R&B/Hip-Hop Songs (Billboard)	41
US Top Black Contemporary Singles (Cash Box)	12

== Certifications ==
Certifications and sales for "Paradise"
Region	Certification	Certified units/sales
United Kingdom (BPI)	Silver	200,000^{‡}
^{‡} Sales+streaming figures based on certification alone.
