= A Wrinkle in Time (2018 film) =

2018 American science fantasy adventure film

- Theatrical release poster
- Directed by: Ava DuVernay
- Screenplay by: Jennifer Lee; Jeff Stockwell
- Based on: A Wrinkle in Time by Madeleine L'Engle
- Produced by: Jim Whitaker; Catherine Hand
- Starring: Oprah Winfrey; Reese Witherspoon; Mindy Kaling; Gugu Mbatha-Raw; Michael Peña; Zach Galifianakis; Chris Pine
- Cinematography: Tobias A. Schliessler
- Edited by: Spencer Averick
- Music by: Ramin Djawadi
- Production companies: Walt Disney Pictures; Whitaker Entertainment
- Distributed by: Walt Disney Studios; Motion Pictures
- Release dates: February 26, 2018 (El Capitan Theatre); March 9, 2018 (United States)
- Running time: 110 minutes
- Country: United States
- Language: English
- Budget: $100–130 million
- Box office: $133 million

A Wrinkle in Time is a 2018 American science fantasy adventure film directed by Ava DuVernay and written by Jennifer Lee and Jeff Stockwell, based on the 1962 novel by Madeleine L'Engle. The film follows a young girl and her adoptive younger brother who, with the help of three astral travelers, sets off on a quest to find their missing father. The film stars Storm Reid, Oprah Winfrey, Reese Witherspoon, Mindy Kaling, Gugu Mbatha-Raw, Michael Peña, Zach Galifianakis, and Chris Pine.

It is Disney's second film adaptation of the novel, following the 2003 television film. Development began in late 2010, with Stockwell writing the first draft of the script, and Lee joining to rewrite it four years later. DuVernay signed on to direct in early 2016. Principal photography began on November 2, 2016, in Los Angeles, California. Near the end of filming, production moved to New Zealand, where photography ended on February 25, 2017. With an estimated production budget of $103 million, the film became the first $100-million-budget live-action film to be directed by an African-American woman. Ramin Djawadi composed and conducted the film's score.

A Wrinkle in Time premiered at the El Capitan Theatre in Los Angeles on February 26, 2018, and was released in the United States by Walt Disney Studios Motion Pictures on March 9. The film received mixed reviews from critics and was a box-office bomb, with a reported loss of $130.6 million at the box office.

== Plot ==
Thirteen-year-old Meg Murry struggles to adjust at school due to bullying and depression, four years after the disappearance of her father, Alex, who was a renowned astrophysicist. Meg discovers her gifted younger brother, Charles Wallace, with an unusual visitor, Mrs. Whatsit, who claims that the tesseract — a method of space travel Alex was studying — is real.

Meg and Charles Wallace meet Calvin O'Keefe, who joins them at the house of Mrs. Who, another strange friend of Charles Wallace: she speaks only in quotations. Calvin has dinner with the Murry family, and Mrs. Murry recalls Alex's commitment to their research despite public ridicule. In the backyard, Mrs. Whatsit and Mrs. Who appear with Mrs. Which, revealing themselves as astral travelers. Explaining that they have come to help find Alex (who did not leave his family, but has transported himself across the universe), the three Misses lead Meg, Calvin, and Charles Wallace through a tesseract to the distant planet Uriel.

The planet's sentient flowers confirm that Alex visited Uriel. Mrs. Whatsit transforms into a leaf-like flying creature, and carries the children into the sky. Calvin nearly falls to his death after noticing a dark planet that Mrs. Which identifies as Camazotz, home to evil energy known as "the IT". They tesser to the planet Orion to seek the help of a seer named Happy Medium. Mrs. Which reveals that the IT spreads negativity throughout the universe, including on Earth.

Happy Medium helps Meg overcome her self-doubt, and they learn that her father tessered to Uriel, then Ixchel, but was trapped on Camazotz. The Misses insist they regroup on Earth, but Meg's determination to save her father overrides the tesseract, unintentionally redirecting them to Camazotz. Unable to stay (as Camazotz's evil is stronger than their light), the Misses bestow gifts before departing: Mrs. Who gives Meg her glasses to see what is really there, Mrs. Whatsit gives Meg the knowledge of her faults, and Mrs. Which gives the children the command to never separate.

A forest appears, separating Meg and Calvin from Charles Wallace. They are pursued by a tornado-like storm; Meg uses the storm's own force to slingshot her and Calvin atop a cliff wall, where they reunite with Charles Wallace. They find themselves in a neighborhood of lookalike homes, children, and mothers; one woman invites the children inside. Meg politely declines her offer, feeling suspicious. Their surroundings transform into a crowded beach, where a man introduces himself as Red. Assuring them that Alex is safe, he offers them food. When Charles Wallace says the food tastes like sand, Red possesses him through the IT, of which Red is actually a puppet.

Meg and Calvin chase after Red and Charles Wallace through the crowd, but are trapped in a seemingly empty, spherical room. Red deactivates, while the possessed Charles Wallace taunts Meg and Calvin. Using Mrs. Who's glasses, Meg finds an invisible staircase to another room where her father is imprisoned. After a happy but tearful reunion, they are dragged away by Charles Wallace to meet his master. As Calvin and Meg fall under the IT's power, Alex opens a tesseract to escape with the two of them. Refusing to abandon Charles Wallace, Meg projects back to Camazotz and confronts the IT in its malevolent, neuron-like form.

Charles Wallace and the IT try to force Meg to give in to darkness, menacing her with an idealized version of herself, but Meg embraces her own imperfections and uses her love for her brother to free him. The IT dissipates as the Misses reappear, congratulating Meg and Charles Wallace on becoming "Warriors of Light". Meg tessers them home, where Alex is reunited with his wife. Meanwhile, Calvin leaves to confront his father, and Meg looks to the sky, thanking the Misses.

== Cast ==
- Oprah Winfrey as Mrs. Which, an astral being as old as the universe
- Reese Witherspoon as Mrs. Whatsit, an astral being whose favorite planet is the planet Uriel
- Mindy Kaling as Mrs. Who, an astral being from the planet Ixchel
- Storm Reid as Meg Murry, a gifted young girl who's been bullied by Veronica for the past years
  - Lyric Wilson as young Meg
- Levi Miller as Calvin O'Keefe, Meg's classmate and friend
- Deric McCabe as Charles Wallace Murry, Meg's smart adoptive six-year-old brother who gets hypnotized by the IT
- Chris Pine as Dr. Alexander Murry, Meg and Charles Wallace's long-lost father and Kate's husband
- Gugu Mbatha-Raw as Dr. Kate Murry, Meg and Charles Wallace's mother and Alex's wife
- Zach Galifianakis as Happy Medium, a seer from the planet Orion
- Michael Peña as Red, a form of The IT
  - David Oyelowo as The IT, Red's true diabolical form
- André Holland as James Jenkins, the principal of Meg, Calvin and Charles Wallace's school
- Rowan Blanchard as Veronica Kiley, a student who bullies Meg because of her absent father, but later regrets her past actions and no longer bullies her. Halfway into the film, it's revealed that she secretly suffers from body dysmorphia
- Bellamy Young as Camazotz Woman, a mother from the Camazotz neighborhood
- Conrad Roberts as Elegant Man, an elder neighbour and friend of Charles Wallace
- Will McCormack and Yvette Cason as two gossipy teachers that are jealous of children with gifts
- Daniel MacPherson as Mr. O'Keefe, Calvin's abusive and unloving father

== Production ==
=== Development ===
In October 2010, Walt Disney Pictures retained the film rights for the 1962 novel A Wrinkle in Time, by Madeleine L'Engle, which had previously been made as a 2003 television film. Following the financial success of Tim Burton's Alice in Wonderland (2010), Disney hired Jeff Stockwell to write the screenplay for Cary Granat and his new Bedrock Studios. Granat had previously worked with Disney on the Chronicles of Narnia and Bridge to Terabithia films. The project's budget was slated to be $35 million, which the company compared to District 9 and Bridge to Terabithia, both of which were made for less than $30 million.

However, A Wrinkle in Time was part of a new California Film Commission tax credit program, which offset production costs considerably. On August 5, 2014, Jennifer Lee was announced as the screenwriter, taking over from Stockwell, who wrote the first draft.

On February 8, 2016, it was reported that Ava DuVernay had been offered the job of directing the film, and she was confirmed to direct later that same month. She became the first African-American woman to direct a live-action film with a production budget of more than $100 million. The decision received positive sentiments in the media industry. Oprah Winfrey was happy to see this because DuVernay herself broke barriers for non-white people in the film industry. "So I do imagine, to be a brown-skinned girl of any race throughout the world, looking up on that screen and seeing Storm, I think that is a capital A, capital W, E, some, AWESOME, experience."

Irene Monroe of The Cambridge Day expressed her feelings that Ava DuVernay was a superb choice of a director because she was able to highlight and expose the struggles experienced by young African-American girls.

=== Casting ===
On July 26, 2016, Variety reported that Oprah Winfrey began final negotiations to join the film to play Mrs. Which, the eldest of the three Mrs. Ws, celestial beings who guide the children along their journey. In September, 2016, Reese Witherspoon and Mindy Kaling were reported to be in talks to join the film, with Witherspoon to play Mrs. Whatsit, a chatty, grandmotherly sprite, and Kaling to play the quotation-reciting Mrs. Who. On September 13, 2016, Storm Reid was cast in the lead role of Meg Murry, a young girl traumatized by the disappearance of her scientist father years before.

In October 2016, Gugu Mbatha-Raw and Chris Pine were cast as Meg's parents, Drs. Kate and Alex Murry. On November 1, 2016, additional cast announcements included Zach Galifianakis as Happy Medium, André Holland as Principal Jenkins, Levi Miller as Calvin, and Deric McCabe as Charles Wallace, along with Bellamy Young, Rowan Blanchard and Will McCormack. Later, Michael Peña joined the cast to play Red. The film producers are James Whitaker and Catherine Hand.

=== Filming ===
Principal photography on the film began November 2, 2016, in Los Angeles, California. Tobias A. Schliessler was the film's cinematographer, Naomi Shohan was production designer, Paco Delgado was costume designer, and Rich McBride was the film's visual effects supervisor. During production, DuVernay asked McBride to be as flexible as possible on visual effects sequences to enable her to make changes and incorporate new ideas during shooting.

Filming for A Wrinkle in Time took place in multiple locations including Eureka, California, in Humboldt County, starting November 29, 2016.

After Los Angeles, production moved to New Zealand for two weeks. During the last two weeks of February 2017, filming locations for A Wrinkle in Time were in Central Otago, New Zealand. Actors and crew were in New Zealand for two weeks to shoot scenes in the Southern Alps, including at Hunter Valley Station near Lake Hāwea, with cast and crew treated to a traditional Māori pōwhiri and karakia. Filming wrapped up in New Zealand's South Island after two weeks, and DuVernay declared the cast and crew's love for New Zealand in an Instagram post.

=== Music ===
On September 28, 2017, Ramin Djawadi was announced as the composer for the film, replacing Jonny Greenwood, who was initially chosen to compose and score the film. On February 20, 2018, it was announced that the soundtrack would feature appearances from Sade, Sia, Kehlani, Chloe x Halle, Freestyle Fellowship, DJ Khaled, and Demi Lovato.

== Release ==
A Wrinkle in Time premiered at the El Capitan Theatre on February 26, 2018, with its theatrical release on March 9, 2018. This was a month ahead of its initial release date of April 6, 2018. The film was released by Walt Disney Studios Home Entertainment on 4K UHD Blu-ray, Blu-ray, and DVD on June 5, 2018. It became available for streaming on Disney+ in the United States on March 25, 2020, after being available since launch elsewhere.

== Reception ==
=== Box office ===
A Wrinkle in Time grossed $100 million in the U.S. and Canada, and $33 million in other territories, for a worldwide total of $133 million. A combined $250 million was spent on production and advertisement. Following Disney's Q2 earnings report in May 2018, Yahoo! Finance deduced the film would lose the studio $86–186 million, and in April 2019, Deadline Hollywood calculated the film lost $130.6 million, when factoring together all expenses and revenues.

In the U.S. and Canada, A Wrinkle in Time was released alongside The Hurricane Heist, Gringo, and The Strangers: Prey at Night, and was projected to gross $30–38 million from 3,980 theaters in its opening weekend. It made $10.2 million on its first day, including $1.3 million from Thursday night previews. It went on to debut at $33.1 million, finishing second behind Disney's own Black Panther ($41.1 million in its fourth weekend). In its second weekend, the film made $16.6 million, dropping 50% to fourth place. On June 15, in its 15th week of release, the film returned to a total of 245 theaters, often as part of a double feature with Incredibles 2 at drive-in theaters, where the box-office revenue was credited equally to both films. It ended up making $1.7 million (a 1,600% increase from the previous weekend), pushing the total U.S. gross to $100 million.

Internationally, the film opened in six countries alongside the U.S. and grossed $6.3 million in its opening weekend, with Russia being the largest market with $4.1 million.

=== Critical response ===
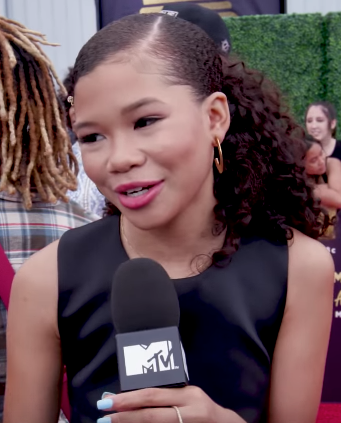
Amidst mixed reviews from critics, Reid's performance was praised, and deemed a "highlight" of the film.

On Rotten Tomatoes, the film holds an approval rating of 43% based on 342 reviews, and an average rating of 5.3/10. The website's critical consensus reads: "A Wrinkle in Time is visually gorgeous, big-hearted, and occasionally quite moving; unfortunately, it's also wildly ambitious to a fault, and often less than the sum of its classic parts." On Metacritic, the film has a weighted average score of 53 out of 100, based on 52 critics, indicating "mixed or average" reviews. Audiences polled by CinemaScore gave the film an average grade of "B" on an A+ to F scale, while PostTrak reported filmgoers gave it a 75% overall positive score; audience members under age 18 gave it an average grade of "A−" and a positive score of 89%.

Alonso Duralde of TheWrap praised the film's visuals and performances, writing: "Awash in bold colors, bright patterns and ebullient kids, director Ava DuVernay's new take on A Wrinkle in Time dazzles its way across time and space even if it doesn't quite stick the landing." David Ehrlich of IndieWire gave the film a "C+" and praised what he described as its ambition, saying: "It almost doesn't matter that the movie is too emotionally prescriptive to have any real power, or too high on imagination to leave any room for wonder; DuVernay evinces such faith in who she is and what she's doing that A Wrinkle in Time remains true to itself even when everything on screen reads false." Jamie Broadnax, a freelance writer and member of the Critic's Choice Awards, tweeted that after seeing the film for the second time, she still was unable to conceptualize and take in the visuals displayed throughout the film and the numerous performances from various characters. Kat Candler, an American independent filmmaker, stated that the film was a "gorgeous love letter to the warriors of the next generation". Mercedes Howze of the New Pittsburgh Courier stated that the visuals were extraordinary and that the film "continues to make lasting impressions on innocent minds to change what it looks like to be a young black woman".

Vince Mancini of Uproxx gave the film a negative review, saying, "...if anything, the trouble with Wrinkle is that you never really get a sense of DuVernay's personal touch. In fact, it feels a lot like Brad Bird's big-budget, equally smarmy 2015 Disney film Tomorrowland. Both attempt to be so broad and universal that they feel disconnected from anything human. But universality doesn't work that way, no matter how much you tell everyone to think like a kid." Conner Schwerdtfeger, former entertainment journalist for CinemaBlend, stated that the movie was "all over the place and underperformed," but that DuVernay deserves some praise for the attempt at filming the seemingly unfilmable. Todd McCarthy of The Hollywood Reporter felt that the film was "unable to charm or disarm" the audience. Wenlei Ma, film and TV critic of news.com.au, stated that, following the halfway mark in the film, movie-goers find themselves "not caring about the other characters besides Meg" and that it seemed to "drag" in the latter half. She called the film a disappointment, regardless of the value parents find in the messages for children via quotations from Mahatma Gandhi and Nelson Mandela.

=== Accolades ===
Award	Date of ceremony	Category	Recipients	Result	Ref.
Teen Choice Awards	August 12, 2018	Choice Fantasy Movie	A Wrinkle in Time	Nominated	
Teen Choice Awards	August 12, 2018	Choice Fantasy Movie Actress	Mindy Kaling	Nominated	
Teen Choice Awards	August 12, 2018	Choice Fantasy Movie Actress	Storm Reid	Nominated	
Teen Choice Awards	August 12, 2018	Choice Fantasy Movie Actress	Oprah Winfrey	Nominated	
Teen Choice Awards	August 12, 2018	Choice Fantasy Movie Actress	Reese Witherspoon	Nominated	
People's Choice Awards	November 11, 2018	Family Movie of 2018	A Wrinkle in Time	Nominated	
St. Louis Film Critics Awards	December 16, 2018	Worst Film of 2018	A Wrinkle in Time	Won	

== See also ==
- List of Afrofuturist films
