= Sade (singer) =

British singer and songwriter (born 1959)

Sade CBE
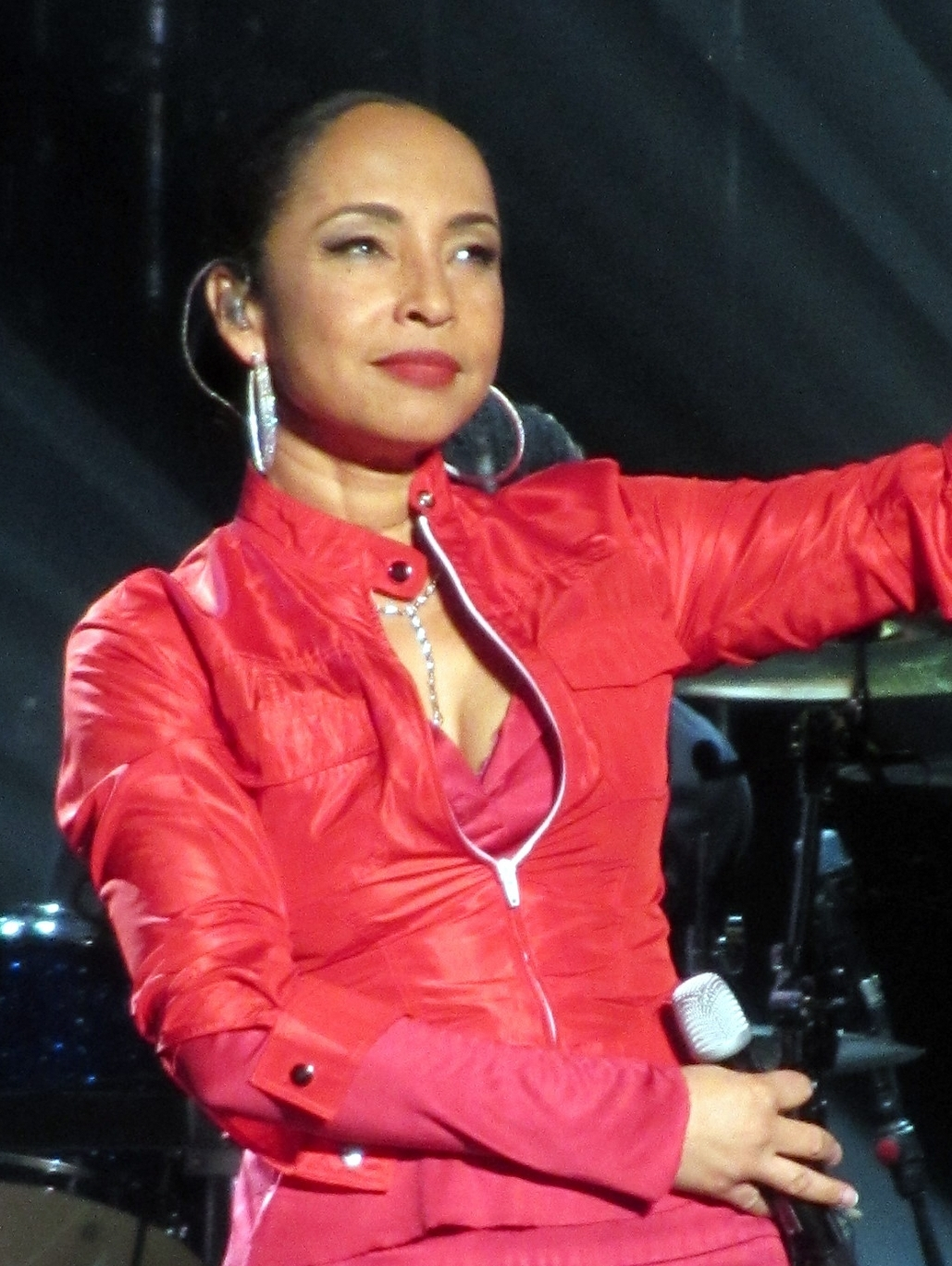
- Sade performing in 2011
- Born: Helen Folasade Adu; 16 January 1959 (age 67); Ibadan, British Nigeria (present-day Nigeria)
- Other name: Sade Adu
- Citizenship: Nigeria; United Kingdom
- Education: Saint Martin's School of Art
- Occupations: Singer; songwriter
- Years active: 1980–present
- Spouses: Carlos Scola Pliego (m. 1989; div. 1995) Ian Watts (m. 2007)
- Children: 1
- Musical career
- Origin: London
- Genres: Smooth jazz; sophisti-pop; quiet storm; soul
- Instrument: Vocals
- Labels: Portrait; Epic; RCA; Sony
- Publisher: Sony Music Publishing
- Member of: Sade
- Website: sade.com

Helen Folasade Adu (Yoruba: Fọláṣadé Adú [fɔ̄láʃādé ādú]; born 16 January 1959), known professionally as Sade (/ˈʃɑːdeɪ/ SHAH-day or /ʃɑːˈdeɪ/ shah-DAY) or Sade Adu, is a Nigerian British singer-songwriter. One of the most successful British female artists in history, she is often recognised as an influence on contemporary music. Her success in the music industry was recognised with the honour Officer of the Order of the British Empire in the 2002 New Year Honours, and she was made Commander in the 2017 Birthday Honours.

Sade was born in Ibadan, Nigeria, and was brought up in England from the age of four. She studied at Saint Martin's School of Art in London and gained modest recognition as a fashion designer and part-time model before joining the band Pride in the early 1980s. After gaining attention as a performer, she formed the band Sade and secured a recording contract with Epic Records in 1983. Their album Diamond Life (1984) became one of the era's best-selling albums and the best-selling debut by a British female vocalist.

In July 1985, Sade was among the performers at the Live Aid charity concert at Wembley Stadium and in November the band released their second album, Promise. The next year, she appeared in the film Absolute Beginners. The band released their third album (Stronger Than Pride) in 1988, and a fourth album (Love Deluxe) in 1992. The band went on hiatus in 1996 after the birth of Sade's child.

The band reunited in 1999 and the following year, released Lovers Rock, their first album in eight years. Lovers Rock was a departure from the band's earlier jazz-inspired sounds. In 2010, the band released Soldier of Love, their sixth studio album, and toured arenas worldwide. Since that tour ended in 2011, the band has released three songs: "Flower of the Universe" for the soundtrack of Disney's A Wrinkle in Time, "The Big Unknown", part of the soundtrack of Steve McQueen's film Widows, and "Young Lion", part of the Red Hot compilation album TRAИƧA in 2024. In 2026, she and her bandmates will be inducted into the Rock and Roll Hall of Fame.

== Early life ==
Helen Folasade Adu was born on 16 January 1959 in the Colonial Nigerian city of Ibadan. Her middle name, Folasade, means "crowned with wealth" in Yoruba. Her parents are Adebisi Adu, a Nigerian lecturer in economics of Yoruba background from Ikere-Ekiti, and Anne Hayes, an English district nurse. Adu and Hayes met in London, married in 1955, and later moved to Nigeria. Sade was four years old when her parents separated. Hayes returned to England with Sade and her elder brother, Banji Adu, to live with their maternal grandparents near Colchester, Essex. At age 11, Sade moved to Holland-on-Sea with her mother and brother. After completing her education at Clacton County High School and Colchester Institute at the age of 18, she moved to London and studied fashion design at Saint Martin's School of Art.

== Career ==
=== 1980–1984: Beginnings and Diamond Life ===
After completing a three-year course in fashion design, and later modelling briefly, Sade began singing backup with British band Pride. During this time, she formed a songwriting partnership with Pride's guitarist/saxophonist Stuart Matthewman; together, backed by Pride's rhythm section, they began doing their own sets at Pride gigs. Her solo performances of the song "Smooth Operator", co-written with Ray St. John, attracted record companies' attention. In 1983, Sade, Matthewman, keyboardist Andrew Hale, bassist Paul Denman, and drummer Paul Cook, split from Pride to form the band that became known as Sade. By the time the band performed its first show at London's Heaven nightclub, Sade herself had become so popular that 1,000 people were turned away at the door. In May 1983, Sade performed their first US show at New York City's Danceteria nightclub. On 18 October 1983, Adu signed with Epic Records, with the rest of the band signing in the next year.

Following the record deal, the group began recording their debut album, Diamond Life, which took six weeks to record and was recorded entirely at The Power Plant in London. Diamond Life was released on 16 July 1984, reached number two in the UK Album Chart, sold over 1.2 million copies in the UK, and won the Brit Award for Best British Album in 1985. The album was also a hit internationally, reaching number one in several countries and the top ten in the US, where it sold in excess of four million copies. Diamond Life had international sales of over six million copies, becoming one of the top-selling debut recordings of the '80s, and the best-selling debut ever by a British female vocalist and female-fronted group.

"Your Love Is King" was released as the album's lead single on 25 February 1984 and was a success in European territories, charting at number seven in Ireland and number six on the UK singles chart. The song was less successful in the US, where it peaked at number 54 on the US Billboard Hot 100. The third single, "Smooth Operator", was released on 15 September 1984 and became the most successful song in the US from the album Diamond Life. The track peaked at number five on the US Billboard Hot 100 and the US Billboard Hot Black Singles, as well as peaking at number one on the US Billboard Adult Contemporary chart. In Europe the song fared well, peaking at number 19 in the UK, and reaching the top 20 on the Austrian, Swiss, French, and West German charts.

=== 1985–1999: Continued success and first hiatus ===
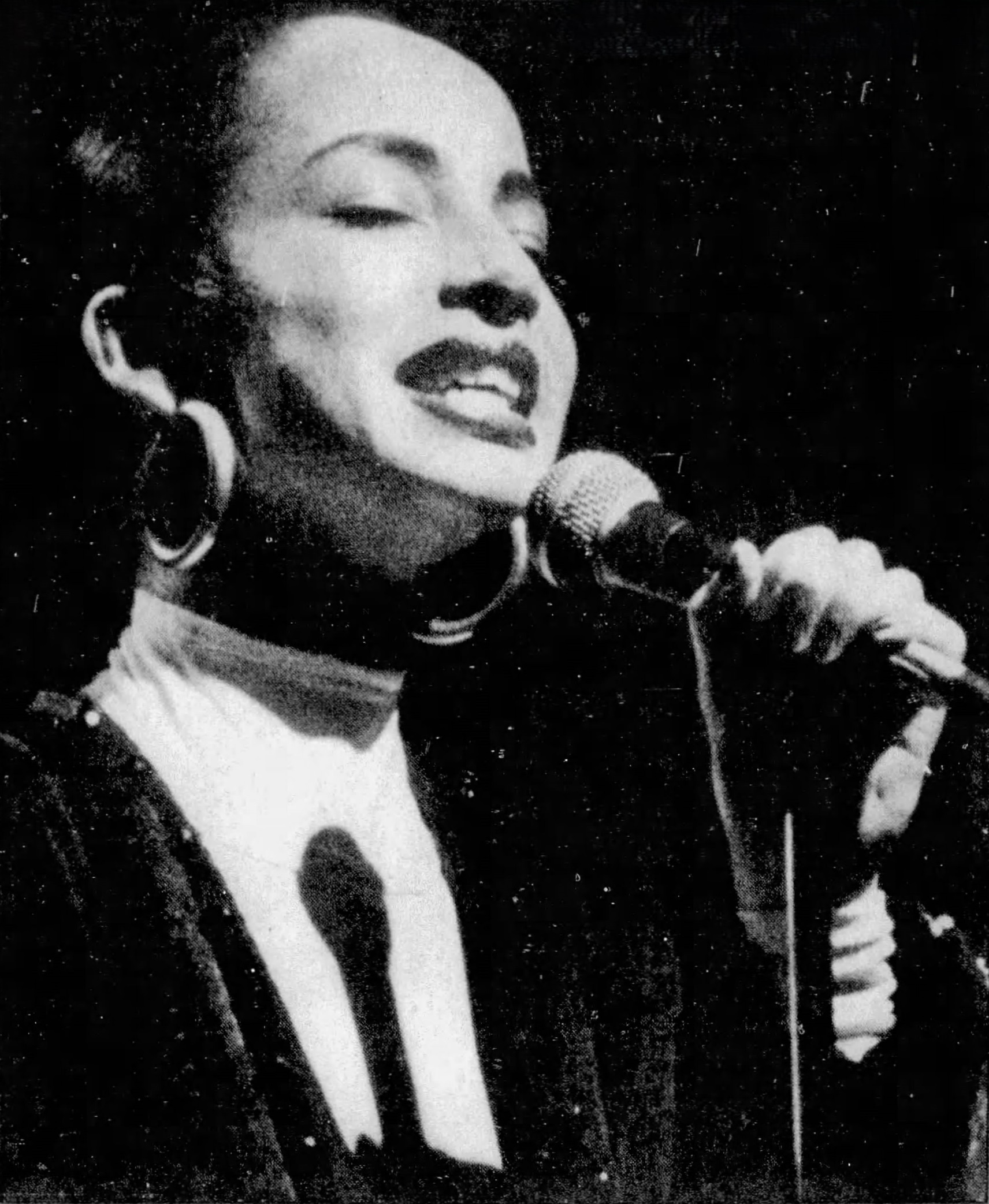
Sade performing in 1985

In late 1985, the band released their second album, Promise, which peaked at number one in both the UK and the US and became the band's first album to reach number one on the US Billboard 200. The album topped the chart in 1986 and spent two weeks at the peak position. Eventually, the album went on to sell four million copies in the region and was certified four times platinum by the Recording Industry Association of America (RIAA). The album spawned two singles "Never as Good as the First Time" and "The Sweetest Taboo," the latter of which was released as the album's lead single and stayed on the US Hot 100 for six months. "The Sweetest Taboo" peaked at number five on the US Billboard Hot 100, number one on the US adult Contemporary chart, and number three on the US Hot R&B/Hip-Hop Singles & Tracks. Sade was so popular that some radio stations reinstated the '70s practice of playing album tracks, adding "Is It a Crime" and "Tar Baby" to their playlists. The following year, 1986, the band won a Grammy Award for Best New Artist.

In 1986, Sade made her acting debut in Absolute Beginners, a film adapted from the book Absolute Beginners by Colin MacInnes about life in late-1950s London. Sade played the role of Athene Duncannon and lent her vocals to the film's soundtrack. The film was screened out of competition at the 1986 Cannes Film Festival and grossed £1.8 million in the UK. Sade's third album, Stronger Than Pride, was released on 3 May 1988, and like Sade's previous album became a commercial success and certified three times platinum in the US. The album was popularized by four singles, most notably the second, "Paradise", which peaked at number 16 on the US Billboard Hot 100 and at number one on their Hot R&B/Hip-Hop Songs, becoming the band's first single to do so.

Love Deluxe was released as the band's fourth studio album on 26 October 1992. It peaked at number three on the US Billboard 200 and has sold 3.4 million copies in the United States. The album was later certified four times platinum by the Recording Industry Association of America (RIAA) for shipments of four million copies. The album was also commercially successful elsewhere, reaching number one in France, and reaching the top ten in New Zealand, Sweden, Switzerland, and the UK. The album went on to be certified gold in the United Kingdom. In November 1994, the group released their first compilation album, The Best of Sade. The album was another top ten hit in both the United Kingdom and the United States, certified platinum and four times platinum, respectively. The compilation album included material from Sade's previous albums, as well as a cover version of "Please Send Me Someone to Love" (1950), originally by Percy Mayfield.

=== 2000–2009: Lovers Rock and second hiatus ===
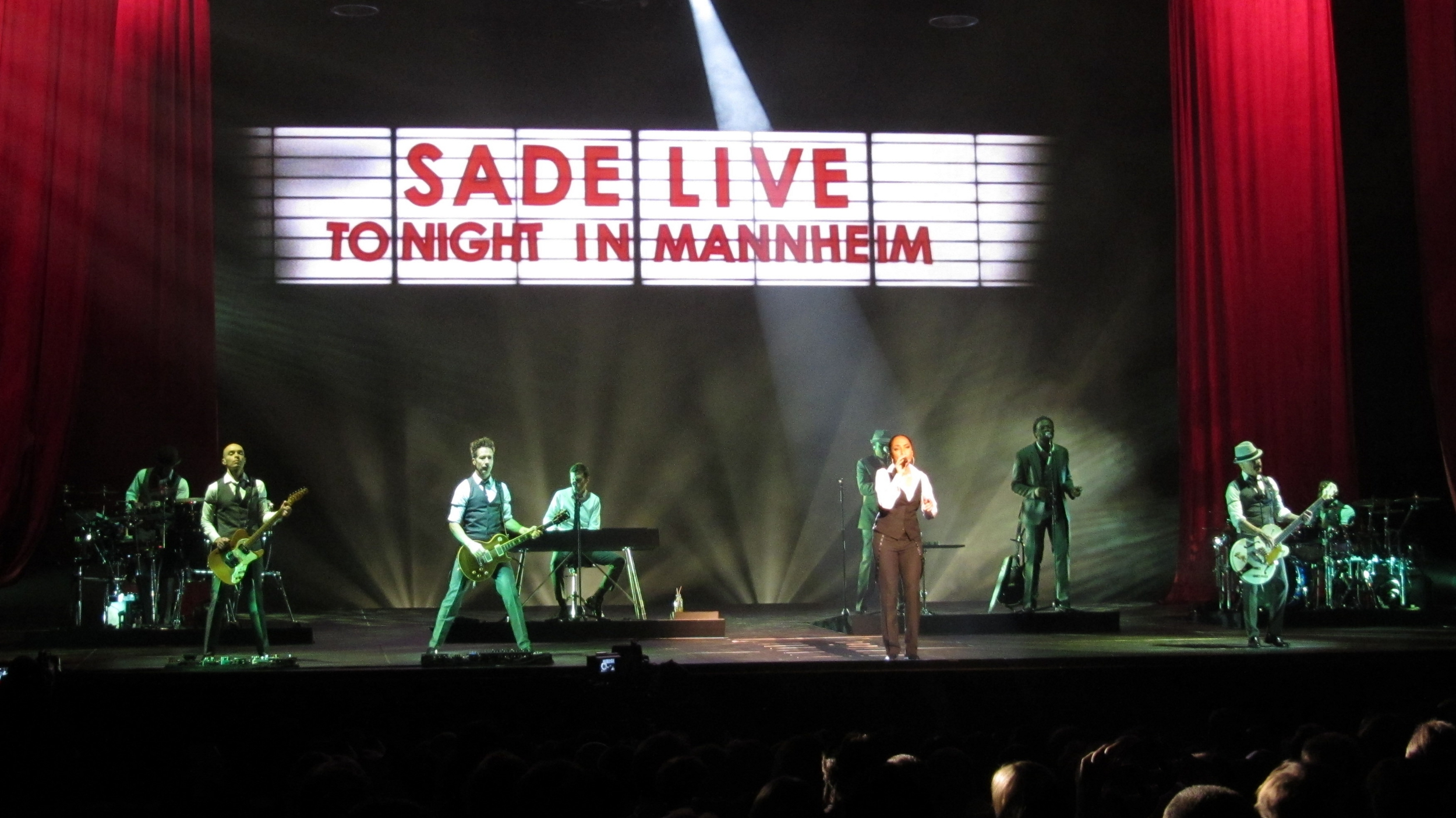
Sade onstage at the SAP-Arena, Mannheim, Germany, 2011-11-16

Following an eight-year hiatus, the band released their fifth studio album, Lovers Rock, on 13 November 2000 and received positive reviews from music critics. The album reached number 18 on the UK Albums Chart, number three on the US Billboard 200, and has since been certified triple platinum by the RIAA, having sold 3.9 million copies in the United States by February 2010. On 27 February 2002, the album earned Sade the Grammy Award for Best Pop Vocal Album, and the lead single "By Your Side" was nominated for the 2002 Grammy Award for Best Female Pop Vocal Performance. Although the single lost out to Nelly Furtado's "I'm Like a Bird", it has been listed as the 48th greatest love song of all time by VH1.

To promote the album, Sade and the band embarked on their fifth concert tour entitled Lovers Rock Tour. The tour was announced via the band's website in April 2001. The announcement stated the tour would begin in the summer of 2001 with 30 shows. Initial dates were rescheduled due to extended rehearsal time. The shows sold well, with many stops adding additional shows. In August 2001, the tour was extended by eight weeks due to ticket demand. Deemed by many critics as a comeback tour, it marked the band's first performances since 1994 and took place in 2001. Although many believed the trek would expand to other countries, this did not occur. With over 40 shows, it became the 13th biggest tour in North America, earning over $26 million.

Following the tour, the band released their first live album, Lovers Live on 5 February 2002 by Epic Records. Lovers Live reached number ten on the US Billboard 200 and number 51 on the UK Albums Chart, the band's first album to miss the top twenty in the UK. The album was certified gold by the RIAA on 7 March 2002, having reached US sales of 562,000 copies, while the DVD was certified platinum on 30 January 2003 for shipping 100,000 copies.

Following the release of Lovers Rock, Sade took a ten-year hiatus, during which she raised her child and moved to Jamaica. During this time, she made a rare public appearance at Buckingham Palace, as she was investitured as an Officer of the Order of the British Empire (OBE) for services to music. In 2002, she appeared on the Red Hot Organization album, Red Hot + Riot, a compilation CD in tribute to the music of Fela Kuti. She recorded a remix of "By Your Side" for the album and was billed as a co-producer.

=== 2010–2017: Soldier of Love and third hiatus ===
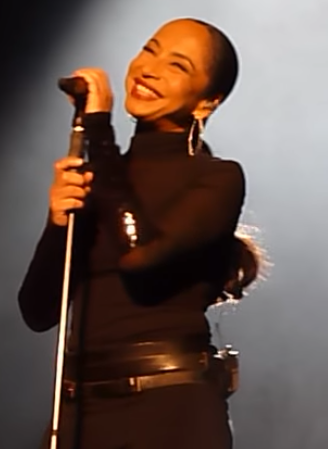
Sade performing in 2011

The band's sixth studio album, Soldier of Love, was released worldwide on 8 February 2010, and was their first in ten years to contain new material. Upon release, it received positive reviews and became a success. The album debuted atop the Billboard 200 in the United States with first-week sales of 502,000 copies. Soldier of Love became the band's first album to debut at number one and their second to peak at number one on the chart. The album also had the best sales week by a group since Australian band AC/DC released their album Black Ice and entered the Billboard 200 at number one in November 2008. Consequently, the band became the act with the longest time between number-one albums, as the band's Promise (1985) and Soldier of Love were separated by 24 years, 10 months and 2 weeks.

The first single and title track, "Soldier of Love", premiered on US radio on 8 December 2009 and was released digitally on 11 January 2010. Subsequent singles, "Babyfather" and "The Moon and the Sky", were played by US urban adult contemporary radio on 13 April and 24 August 2010, respectively. At the 53rd Annual Grammy Awards in 2011, the title track won Best R&B Performance by a Duo or Group with Vocals, while the song, "Babyfather", was nominated for Best Pop Performance by a Duo or Group with Vocals.

In April 2011, the band began their Sade Live tour (also known as the "Once in a Lifetime Tour" or the "Soldier of Love Tour"). The band toured Europe, the Americas, Australia and Asia to promote the band's sixth studio album and their second compilation album, The Ultimate Collection (2011). This trek marked the band's first tour in nearly a decade and ranked 27th in Pollstar's "Top 50 Worldwide Tour (Mid-Year)", earning over 20 million dollars. At the conclusion of 2011, the tour placed tenth on Billboard's annual "Top 25 Tours", earning over $50 million with 59 shows. The tour was chronicled with Bring Me Home - Live 2011, released in May 2012.

=== 2018–present: Return ===
In March 2018, she (and the reunited Sade band) released the acoustic ballad "Flower of the Universe" for the soundtrack to the Disney film A Wrinkle in Time. About asking Sade to contribute to the album, director Ava DuVernay wrote "I never thought she'd say yes, but asked anyway." Later that year, Sade released "The Big Unknown" for the soundtrack to the 20th Century Fox film Widows. The film's director, Steve McQueen, stated that Sade agreed to write the song for the film, because "the original series of Widows had deeply resonated with her." For a couple of weeks in 2022, the band visited Miraval Studios in France for the first time since recording some of their albums Promise and Stronger Than Pride. The successor to Soldier of Love is rumoured to be in progress. She recorded "Young Lion", which was dedicated to her son Izaak, for the Red Hot Organization's transgender advocacy compilation album Transa (2024).

== Legacy and influence ==
The New Yorker described Sade's voice as a "grainy contralto full of air that betrays a slight ache but no agony, and values even imperfect dignity over a show of pain", a "deeply English" quality that makes categorising the artist's voice difficult. Her voice was described by the BBC as "husky and restrained" and compared to singer Billie Holiday. BBC called her songwriting "sufficiently soulful and jazzy yet poppy, funky yet easy listening, to appeal to fans of all those genres." Sade has been called a "pop star". With the musicians in her band, Sade, The New Yorker wrote, "created one of the most profitable catalogues in pop"; the band's "easy" sound backing songs "exploring the heavier lifting inside love: commitment, consistency, friendship." Her success has been attributed to a combination of her unique beauty, seemingly indefinable origins, and mysterious persona. In 2023, Rolling Stone ranked Sade at No. 51 on their list of the 200 Greatest Singers of All Time.

Sade's work has influenced and been recognised by many singers and hip hop artists. Rapper Rakim of Eric B. & Rakim stated he grew up listening to Sade's music and was influenced by her voice and style. Rakim has also referred to Sade's song "Smooth Operator" in the song "Microphone Fiend" (1988). Talib Kweli stated he learned about precision from Sade due to her performance of Love Deluxe in its entirety at Madison Square Garden. Rapper Missy Elliott cited Sade's performance of "Smooth Operator" as one of her favourites. Hip hop group Souls of Mischief stated they grew up listening to Sade's music. Hip hop group Tanya Morgan also described Sade as one of their favourite artists. Other rappers to recognise Sade include the rap duo of Clipse – Malice and Pusha. In reaction to the newly released album Soldier of Love, rapper Kanye West wrote, "This is why i still have a blog. To be a part of moments like this ... new Sade ... How much better this ... than everything else?". Rapper Rick Ross stated in an interview that "People may know my infatuation with Sade. There's never been a bad Sade track. I love all different sides."

The late singer Aaliyah said that she admired Sade because "she stays true to her style no matter what ... she's an amazing artist, an amazing performer ... and I absolutely love her." American R&B singer Brandy has cited Sade as one of her major vocal influences. Heavy metal singers Greg Puciato and Chino Moreno have also named her as an inspiration. Ernest Greene of Washed Out has said that Sade's music and fashion sense are a big inspiration for him.

== Personal life ==
Sade squatted in Tottenham, North London, in the 1980s with her then-boyfriend Robert Elms.

In 1989, she married Spanish film director Carlos Pliego. Their marriage ended in 1995.

Sade moved to Jamaica in 1995 where she was in a relationship with music producer Bob Morgan. On 21 July 1996, she gave birth to her first child, who later sang on Sade's song "Babyfather" in 2010.

In 2005, Sade moved to a village near Stroud, Gloucestershire, where she bought a run-down cottage to renovate. She retained her Georgian house in North London for business meetings.

She has been in a relationship with Ian Watts, a former Royal Marine, since 2007; from this relationship, she has a stepson.

In 2016, on National Coming Out Day, Sade's child, Izaak Theo Adu, came out as a transgender man. In September 2019, Izaak posted a message online, thanking his mother for her support through his transition. In late 2024, Sade and the Red Hot Organization's TRAИƧA project released "Young Lion", a song dedicated to her son.

Sade rarely gives interviews.

== Honours, awards and nominations ==
In 1986, Sade became the first Nigerian-born artist to win a Grammy Award when she was named Best New Artist. In the 2002 New Year Honours, she was appointed an Officer of the Order of the British Empire (OBE) for services to popular music, and stated her award was "a great gesture to me and all black women in England". She was promoted to Commander of the same Order (CBE) in the 2017 Birthday Honours, again for services to music.

In 2023, Sade was invited to be inducted into the Songwriters Hall of Fame. She became a nominee for induction into the Rock and Roll Hall of Fame in 2024 and was elected in 2026.

== Discography ==
With Sade

- Diamond Life (1984)
- Promise (1985)
- Stronger Than Pride (1988)
- Love Deluxe (1992)
- Lovers Rock (2000)
- Soldier of Love (2010)

== Tours ==
- Diamond Life Tour (1984)
- Promise Tour (1985–1986)
- Stronger Than Pride Tour (1988)
- Love Deluxe World Tour (1993)
- Lovers Rock Tour (2001)
- Sade Live (2011)
