= List of Madam Secretary characters =

Roles in the America political drama TV series (2014-2019)

Madam Secretary is an American political drama television series. It aired on CBS from 2014 to 2019 and stars Téa Leoni, Tim Daly, Bebe Neuwirth, Željko Ivanek, Erich Bergen, Patina Miller, Geoffrey Arend, Wallis Currie-Wood, Kathrine Herzer, Evan Roe, Keith Carradine, Sebastian Arcelus, Sara Ramirez, and Kevin Rahm.

== Overview ==
Character	Portrayed by	Appearances					
Character	Portrayed by	Season 1	Season 2	Season 3	Season 4	Season 5	Season 6
Main characters
Elizabeth McCord	Téa Leoni	Main	Main	Main	Main	Main	Main
Henry McCord	Tim Daly	Main	Main	Main	Main	Main	Main
Nadine Tolliver	Bebe Neuwirth	Main	Main	Main	Main		
Russell Jackson	Željko Ivanek	Main	Main	Main	Main	Main	Main
Blake Moran	Erich Bergen	Main	Main	Main	Main	Main	Main
Daisy Grant	Patina Miller	Main	Main	Main	Main	Main	Main
Matt Mahoney	Geoffrey Arend	Main	Main	Main	Main	Main	Main
Stephanie McCord	Wallis Currie-Wood	Main	Main	Main	Main	Main	Main
Alison McCord	Kathrine Herzer	Main	Main	Main	Main	Main	Main
Jason McCord	Evan Roe	Main	Main	Main	Main	Main	Main
Conrad Dalton	Keith Carradine	Recurring	Main	Main	Main	Main	Main
Jay Whitman	Sebastian Arcelus	Recurring	Recurring	Main	Main	Main	Main
Kat Sandoval	Sara Ramirez				Main	Main	
Michael Barnow	Kevin Rahm	Recurring	Recurring	Recurring	Recurring	Recurring	Main
Recurring characters
Ellen Hill	Johanna Day	Recurring	Recurring	Recurring	Recurring	Recurring	Recurring
Ed Parker	Tony Plana	Recurring	Recurring	Recurring	Recurring	Recurring	Recurring
Ming Chen	Francis Jue	Recurring	Recurring	Recurring	Recurring	Recurring	Recurring
Lucy Knox	Mandy Gonzalez	Recurring	Recurring	Recurring	Recurring	Recurring	
Gordon Becker	Mike Pniewski	Recurring	Recurring	Recurring	Recurring	Recurring	
Harrison Dalton	Jason Ralph	Recurring	Recurring				
Darren Harn	Cotter Smith	Recurring	Recurring				
Andrew Munsey	Patrick Breen	Recurring					
Juliet Humphrey	Nilaja Sun	Recurring		Guest			
Zahed Javani	Usman Ally	Recurring					
Fred Cole	Dion Graham	Recurring					
Arthur Gilroy	Josh Hamilton	Recurring					
Mary Campbell	Anna Deavere Smith	Recurring					
Isabelle Barnes	Marin Hinkle	Recurring					
Anton Gorev	Yorgo Constantine	Recurring	Recurring				
Ephraim Ware	Clifton Davis		Recurring	Recurring	Recurring	Recurring	Recurring
Craig Sterling	Julian Acosta		Recurring				
Mark Delgado	Alex Fernandez		Recurring				
Maria Ostrova	Angela Gots		Recurring				
Louise Cronenberg	Leslie Hendrix		Recurring				
Jane Fellows	Jill Hennessy		Recurring				
Oliver Shaw	Kobi Libii		Recurring	Guest			
Dmitri Petrov	Chris Petrovski		Recurring	Guest	Recurring		Recurring
Jose Campos	Carlos Gómez		Recurring	Recurring			
Walter Novack	René Auberjonois		Recurring	Recurring	Recurring	Recurring	
Jareth Glover	Christopher O'Shea		Recurring	Recurring	Recurring		
Sam Evans	J. C. MacKenzie			Recurring			
Ronnie Baker	Justine Lupe			Recurring	Recurring	Recurring	
Susan Thompson	Tonya Pinkins			Recurring	Recurring	Recurring	Recurring
Peter Harriman	Skipp Sudduth				Guest	Recurring	Guest
Mark Hanson	Wentworth Miller						Recurring

== Main characters ==
=== Elizabeth McCord ===
Elizabeth "Bess" Adams McCord is the United States Secretary of State and the central protagonist of Madam Secretary. She is portrayed by Téa Leoni.

Elizabeth was born and raised in Virginia, where she and her brother Will (Eric Stoltz) were orphaned in 1983 after their parents were killed in a car accident. She later attended Houghton Hall Boarding School and the University of Virginia studying mathematics, where one of her professors was future Chief Justice of the United States Frawley (Morgan Freeman). Elizabeth first met Henry McCord (Tim Daly) while attending UVA, and the pair married in 1990. They have three children: Stephanie (Wallis Currie-Wood), Alison (Kathrine Herzer) and Jason (Evan Roe).

Elizabeth worked as a CIA analyst for 20 years, eventually reaching the position of Station Chief in Baghdad before resigning over an ethical dilemma and returning to the University of Virginia to teach political science.

Following the death of Secretary of State Vincent Marsh (Brian Stokes Mitchell) in a suspicious plane crash, Elizabeth is approached by President Conrad Dalton (Keith Carradine)- her former mentor at the CIA- to serve in his cabinet as Secretary of State. Not a natural politician, Elizabeth frequently clashes with White House Chief of Staff Russell Jackson (Željko Ivanek). Much of her first year as Secretary of State is spent investigating her predecessor's death.

Elizabeth speaks fluent French, German, Arabic, Persian, and "a year of high school Spanish".

In the sixth season, Elizabeth is elected President of the United States.

=== Henry McCord ===
Professor (Dr.) Henry McCord is the husband of United States Secretary of State Elizabeth McCord and the father of Stevie, Alison, and Jason McCord. He is a retired United States Marine Corps Captain, professor of theology and ethics, and later the First Gentleman of the United States. He is portrayed by Tim Daly.

Born and raised in Pittsburgh, Pennsylvania, Henry is the son of Patrick McCord (Tom Skerritt)- a steel worker- and has three siblings: Maureen, Shane, and Erin. Henry is Catholic, and was an altar boy in his youth. Henry attended the University of Virginia on a scholarship, where he met his future wife, Elizabeth Adams, and was a member of the Naval Reserve Officer Training Corps. He was commissioned in the United States Marine Corps after graduation and served five years on active duty, during which he was assigned to the 3rd Marine Air Wing out of Marine Corps Air Station Miramar and flew F/A-18 Hornets during Operation Desert Storm. Henry mustered out of the Corps with the rank of Captain.

After leaving the Marines, Henry returned to academia, where he earned his Ph.D. in Philosophy and became a renowned religious scholar. He has published eight books (as of the first season) and has worked as a professor at the University of Virginia, Georgetown University, and the National War College, where he serves as chairman of the Military Ethics Department.

Not long after his wife was appointed Secretary of State, Henry found himself back in government service, working for, among others, the National Security Agency, the Defense Intelligence Agency, the Federal Bureau of Investigation, and the Central Intelligence Agency as both a consultant and an operative. At the end of the third season, Henry was named head of the CIA's Special Activities Division; he eventually resigned after failing to receive Congressional support for his operations in Afghanistan. Upon taking his leave, Henry and his team were awarded the National Intelligence Meritorious Unit Citation, having turned down the individual National Intelligence Distinguished Service Medal, as he believed he wasn't in service long enough to qualify for such an award.

In the fifth season, Henry is hired by President Dalton as his personal Ethics Advisor, which requires him to step down as Chairman of the National War College's Military Ethics Department.

=== Nadine Tolliver ===
Nadine Tolliver is the Chief of Staff to the United States Secretary of State Elizabeth McCord. She is portrayed by Bebe Neuwirth.

A graduate of Cornell University and Yale Law School, Nadine is a veteran politician who worked for Secretary of State Vincent Marsh since he was a Senator, during which the two of them carried on a six-year affair that ended with his death. Due to her relationship with Marsh, Nadine is hesitant to warm up to his replacement, but eventually relents as Elizabeth wins her over.

In the fourth season, Nadine retires from the State Department and moves to the San Francisco Bay Area to be closer to her son and his girlfriend, who are expecting their first child.

=== Russell Jackson ===
Russell Jackson is the White House Chief of Staff to President Conrad Dalton. He is portrayed by Željko Ivanek.

Early into Elizabeth's term as Secretary of State, Russell frequently clashed with her due to her unorthodox diplomatic style and lack of political experience. However, they eventually grew to trust each other, as they worked together to oust Dalton's National Security Advisor Craig Sterling (Julian Acosta) and eventually Russell admitted that he'd like to see her succeed Dalton as president.

In "The Unnamed", it is revealed that Russell met Dalton just after the latter's unsuccessful run for Governor of California.

Russell retired after the end of President Dalton's term, but was rehired by President McCord after her acting Chief of Staff Mike B refused to take the job full-time. His political career has taken a toll on his long-standing marriage, which nearly ends in the sixth season.

=== Blake Moran ===
Blake Moran is the personal assistant to United States Secretary of State Elizabeth McCord. He is portrayed by Erich Bergen.

In the fifth season, Blake is fired as Secretary McCord's personal assistant—per an agreement between the two that he would seek career advancement within a year—and then rehired as her assistant policy advisor.

In the sixth season, Blake has become the Personal Secretary to President McCord.

=== Daisy Grant ===
Daisy Grant is the press coordinator for United States Secretary of State Elizabeth McCord. She is portrayed by Patina Miller.

During the first season, Daisy dates fellow State Department staffer Matt Mahoney. In the third season, she dates "Kevin" from Budget and Planning, who turns out to be an undercover operative for the CIA investigating the State Department. He is killed in a weapons-trafficking conspiracy, and Daisy subsequently finds herself pregnant with his child. In the fourth season, Daisy gives birth to a daughter, Joanna Grant. (The character's pregnancy was written into the series to accommodate the actress' real-life pregnancy.)

In the sixth season, Daisy has become President McCord's White House Press Secretary.

=== Matt Mahoney ===
Matthew Asad "Matt" Mahoney is the speechwriter for United States Secretary of State Elizabeth McCord. He is portrayed by Geoffrey Arend.

Born to an Irish-American Catholic father and a Pakistani-American Muslim mother in Illinois, Matt describes himself as agnostic, but is routinely profiled as a Muslim.

=== Stephanie McCord ===
Stephanie "Stevie" McCord is Henry and Elizabeth's oldest child. She is portrayed by Wallis Currie-Wood.

Stevie briefly attended Lovell University. Upon dropping out, she moved back with her parents and two younger siblings. After working for some time, she resumed her studies at Georgetown University. At one point, she applied to Harvard Law school but didn't follow through.

In the third season, Stevie begins serving as an intern to Russell Jackson; when Jackson suffers a heart attack, Stevie saves his life by performing CPR on him.

The show explores Stevie's challenges with her romantic partners, Arthur Gilroy, her 39-year-old boss while working at Microloan; her childhood friend Harrison Dalton, who was newly out of rehab and still struggling with addiction; Jareth Glover, a British astrophysicist to whom she was engaged for over a year before calling it off; and Alexander Mehranov, who turns out to be Henry's CIA asset/analyst Dmitri Petrov; she eventually reconciles with Dmitri and they marry in the sixth-season finale.

=== Alison McCord ===
Alison McCord is Henry and Elizabeth's middle child. She and Stevie do not get along well, though as the series progresses the sisters form a closer relationship. She is portrayed by Kathrine Herzer.

=== Jason McCord ===
Jason McCord is Henry and Elizabeth's youngest child and only son. He is an outspoken leftist and anarchist who often gets himself into trouble for his political views and short temper. He is portrayed by Evan Roe.

=== Conrad Dalton ===
Conrad Joseph Dalton is the President of the United States. He is portrayed by Keith Carradine.

A Marine Corps veteran, Conrad serves as a 2nd Lieutenant in the Vietnam War, where he earns a Bronze Star and a Purple Heart. Before entering politics, Conrad is the Director of the Central Intelligence Agency, where he serves as the mentor and boss of then-CIA Analyst Elizabeth McCord. After the death of Secretary of State Vincent Marsh, President Dalton appoints Elizabeth to succeed Marsh.

In 2008, Conrad runs an unsuccessful campaign to become Governor of California; after the loss, he meets his future White House Chief of Staff Russell Jackson (Željko Ivanek).

In the third season, Conrad fails to receive his party's nomination for a second term as president, losing to Pennsylvania governor Sam Evans, after revamping the United States' entire foreign policy for military base locations. Nevertheless, Dalton remains popular enough with certain parts of the population that Elizabeth convinces him to run as an independent. After a hard campaign, Dalton narrowly wins the swing state of Ohio, deadlocking the Electoral College and staging a contingent election in the House of Representatives. He eventually wins the election after defusing a military confrontation between Iran and Israel, and negotiating a framework for peace between the two countries.

In "Sound and Fury", Conrad takes a medical leave of absence under Section 3 of the 25th Amendment, leaving Vice President Teresa Hurst serving as acting president. He returned to the Presidency after two months.

Between the fifth and sixth seasons, Conrad completed his term in office and has been succeeded as president by Elizabeth.

Conrad is married to Lydia Dalton, with whom he has a son, Harrison, who struggles with drug addiction. He also has a brother, John Dalton.

=== Jay Whitman ===
Jay Whitman is the senior policy advisor to United States Secretary of State Elizabeth McCord. After the retirement of Nadine Tolliver in the fourth season, Jay becomes the new Chief of Staff. He is portrayed by Sebastian Arcelus.

Originally from Connecticut, Jay and his family moved to Dallas when he was a child. His first work in politics came when he helped future Texas Governor Lockwood run for Mayor of Galveston, Texas as a college student.

Like most of Elizabeth's senior staff, Jay worked for her predecessor, Vincent Marsh, as his senior policy advisor, and remained with the State Department after his death. Jay was initially reluctant to work for Elizabeth, particularly as he had been preparing to accompany Secretary Marsh on a potential White House bid when he challenged President Conrad Dalton in the 2016 primaries. Jay's displeasure at working for a woman who lacked such ambition and the loss of the possibility of working in the White House was something he eventually expressed to Elizabeth. Jay's apparent displeasure is seemingly expressed in the first-season episode "Whisper of the Ax": after Elizabeth is humiliated before Congress while defending the State Department's micro-loan program, she angrily berates her inherited staff and she seemingly fires Jay as the first sign of staff re-organization. A disgruntled Jay is approached at a bar by one of her political enemies, seeking information in return for employment. At the next hearing, Jay's information is used by the Secretary's enemies to further humiliate her and gut the State Department's budget. However, the ploy backfires and the micro-loans program is saved. At the end of the episode, Jay is revealed to have been working for Elizabeth the whole time, his firing having been organized between them so he could leak false information and outflank her opponents.

At the start of the series, Jay was married to Abby Whitman, who gave birth to a daughter, Chloe Elizabeth Whitman, in the first season. In the third season, Abby leaves him. When he comes back from being kidnapped, Abby wants to work on things but they ultimately do not reconcile. They now share custody of Chloe.

In the fifth season, Jay meets a world-famous Dutch chess player named Annalies De Runnow while stuck in an Irish airport. They are instantly attracted to one another and, over the course of several hours stuck in transit and many chess games (which Jay loses), they decide to start a long-distance relationship. Although Jay originally joins Elizabeth's presidential campaign at the end of the fifth season, it is revealed at the beginning of the sixth season that he opted to leave politics and start a life in Amsterdam with Annalies.

Jay returns in the sixth-season finale for Stevie McCord and Dmitri Petrov's wedding at the White House, where he is warmly embraced by Elizabeth. After teasing her about getting impeached the second he left her staff, he tells her that he and Annalies are returning to DC, and that they are expecting a baby. After Russell Jackson's resignation, Jay becomes Elizabeth's third White House Chief of Staff.

=== Kat Sandoval ===
Katelyn "Kat" Sandoval is the policy advisor to Secretary of State Elizabeth McCord. She once served as the Chief of Staff to the United States Ambassador to the United Nations, but left politics to become an avocado farmer in California after allegedly throwing a chair at a difficult diplomat. She is bisexual, divorced, and has a child named Desi. She is portrayed by Sara Ramirez.

=== Michael Barnow ===
Michael "Mike B." Barnow (Kevin Rahm) is a political official who is said to drift between the United States Cabinet departments. He is a Rhodes Scholar who turned his brilliant legal career into a promising political career that was cut short by a scandalous divorce six years prior to his first appearance in the series. He is often seen assisting Secretary McCord.

During the fifth season, Mike runs Elizabeth's campaign for president and, after her election, he serves as her interim White House Chief of Staff (a job he did not want) for her first 100 days in office, until Elizabeth convinces Russell Jackson to come out of retirement; Mike subsequently becomes counselor to the President (the position he originally wanted in her administration).

== Recurring characters ==
=== Vincent Marsh ===
The first United States Secretary of State in the Dalton administration, Vincent Marsh (portrayed by Brian Stokes Mitchell) is a former Senator who had ambitions of being President. He was killed in a plane crash over the Atlantic Ocean in 2014. He was succeeded by Elizabeth McCord, who investigated his death and learned that he was part of an attempted coup d'état against Iran, but was killed by his co-conspirators when he began having doubts about the plan.

=== Ellen Hill ===
The first female Chairwoman of the Joint Chiefs of Staff, Admiral Ellen Hill, USN (portrayed by Johanna Day) established a strong working friendship with the newly appointed United States Secretary of State Elizabeth McCord, often bonding over the difficulties of being a woman in such high political positions. She retired from the Navy in 2015, and was succeeded as Chairman of the Joint Chiefs by Gen. Kelsey Reeves.

Since "On the Clock", Ret. Adm. Hill has been serving as the National Security Advisor, taking over for Craig Sterling.

Adm. Hill's son, 1st Lieutenant Andrew Hill, USAF, is an Air Force Academy graduate who Prof. McCord helped file for conscientious objector status after he realized that he would never be able to take a life, no matter how justified the action or noble the cause.

=== Ed Parker ===
A flag officer in the United States Navy, Admiral Ed Parker (Tony Plana) is often found running military operations in the White House Situation Room.

In the sixth season, ADM Parker was relieved of duty and taken into custody for leaking a story about President McCord sending in United States Navy SEALs on a dangerous mission (during which they endured casualties) instead of automated unmanned ground vehicles, telling her that a commander's duty was to the safety of his or her men.

=== Ming Chen ===
Elizabeth's Chinese counterpart, Ming Chen (Chinese: 陈明; Francis Jue), serves as the Foreign Minister of the People's Republic of China. He and Elizabeth are frequently on opposite sides and consider each other worthy adversaries. As they are both courting African countries for economic partnerships, Chen and Elizabeth have a more in-depth conversation about their motivations and he tells her that his father was killed during the Cultural Revolution. Following this conversation, the two adversaries lament that they will now have to see each other as friends as well.

In the fifth season, Chen is considered one of the potential successors to Chinese President Li and began amassing support from the National People's Congress delegates to secure his accession. However, when a fire breaks out in an Italian sweatshop owned by a Chinese company, the US files a complaint against China's labor conditions in order to draw it into an agreement on improving labor rights. China retaliates by imposing tariffs on US goods, and Chen also insists to Elizabeth that the US needs to stand down, leading her to conclude that he is hoping to become China's next president, a situation that would improve relations between their two countries considerably. However, Chen soon receives word that President Li, breaking the precedents set by his predecessors, will reappoint himself for a five-year term. In defiance of his superiors, Chen, his daughter and his top aide visit the location of the fire and lay a wreath before it.

The friendship between the two comes to the fore in the penultimate episode of the series, when a confrontation between Chinese and American vessels in the South China Sea results in the deaths of 24 American sailors. President Li refuses to back down in front of Elizabeth, who is now President of the United States. Eager to prevent the crisis from escalating, Elizabeth secretly meets Chen in New York to broker a deal. During a conversation similar to many they have had in the past, Elizabeth tells Chen about her daughter's upcoming wedding to Dmitri Petrov and her hope that they will be able see their children grow up. Chen congratulates her and they successfully negotiate a compromise to end to the crisis.

Chen is seen one last time, in a non-speaking role, as a guest at Stevie McCord and Dmitri Petrov's White House wedding in the final episode.

=== Craig Sterling ===
The new National Security Advisor in the second season, Craig Sterling (Julian Acosta) is a former United States Department of Defense official and a former, bitter rival of Secretary McCord, who considered Sterling to be a self-serving, arrogant, and overly-ambitious. Following his appointment into his office, Sterling behaves sycophantically towards President Dalton and antagonistically towards McCord and Russell Jackson. Eventually, McCord and Jackson realize that Sterling had been working to sabotage them in order to influence Dalton unhindered, as well as escalate tensions with Russia into warfare. Afterwards the two to conspire to force Sterling to resign.

=== Dmitri Petrov ===
Originally a captain in the Russian Army, Dmitri Petrov (Chris Petrovski) is attending the National War College when his ethics professor, Henry McCord, recruits him on behalf of the Defense Intelligence Agency to become an American spy in exchange for getting his sick sister medical care in Stockholm, Sweden.

During the Russian conflict with the Ukraine, Petrov serves on the staff of General Vladimir Doroshevich, Russia's ranking officer, while spying for the Americans. As part of the peace negotiations, the United States agrees to give up the identity of their spy in the Russian Army in exchange for Russian withdrawal from the Ukraine theater, leaving Petrov captured and imprisoned for treason and espionage by his native Russia. Eventually, as a result of this betrayal, and after much agonizing on the realpolitik and ethics of the decision by Elizabeth and Henry McCord, at the end of the second season, Petrov is sent to America in a prisoner exchange and subsequently given a new identity in witness protection.

During the fourth season, Petrov begins working for the Central Intelligence Agency as an analyst under Henry McCord, who is now the head of the Special Activities Division; Petrov also starts secretly dating Stevie McCord after a chance meeting. When Petrov's identity is compromised to Russian intelligence after a failed operation under Henry McCord's supervision and an assassination attempt on Petrov ensues, Petrov is reassigned to Alaska for his safety, after an assassination attempt by Russian-inspired elements.

In the sixth season, Petrov returns to Washington after Elizabeth McCord has attained the presidency, after she arranges an amnesty for past spies between the United States and Russia. Petrov reconciles with and marries Stevie.

=== Carlos Morejon ===
The junior (senior as of the fifth season) Senator from Arizona, Carlos Morejon (José Zúñiga) is a political rival of both Secretary of State Elizabeth McCord and President Dalton, although he has been known to work with them on certain issues. In the fourth season, Senator Morejon begins serving as the Chairman of the Senate Intelligence Committee. In the fifth season, he also sits on the Senate Foreign Relations Committee.

In the sixth season, after hearing a rumour that he is being considered as a vice presidential candidate by her Republican opponent, Elizabeth approaches Morejon and asks him to be her running mate. Morejon at first refuses, arguing that while he respects her and acknowledging the fact that they like each other personally, they remain rivals on almost every single issue. However, Elizabeth tells him that it was this difference of opinions that makes them perfect for each other, that no matter how much they have fought each other in the past, they have also known when to come together and compromise if it was necessary. Despite his initial reluctance, Morejon eventually agrees, and he is announced as Elizabeth's running mate.

The McCord-Morejon ticket eventually defeats both the Republican and Democratic candidates and Carlos Morejon becomes Vice President of the United States.

As vice president, Morejon stirs up controversy when he prevents a Marine who has recently been decorated with the Medal of Honor by President McCord from testifying before a House committee in favour of veterans' care reform, a cause supported by Henry McCord. When the Marine dies publicly as a result of his PTSD, Morejon accompanies the McCords to the funeral. In a private conversation between himself and Elizabeth, he expresses regret that he did not let the Marine testify and reveals that he still has doubts about his presence in the McCord administration, doubts that Elizabeth guarantees to him that she does not share. He nevertheless remains steadfastly loyal to her when Republicans led by Senator Hanson try to impeach her, and breaks a tie in the Senate to confirm Elizabeth's nominee to the Federal Trade Commission in a larger bid to regulate Big Tech companies.

=== Teresa Hurst ===
Conrad Dalton's Vice President of the United States during his second term, Teresa Hurst (portrayed by Jan Maxwell in the third season and by Jayne Atkinson in the fourth season) is the former senior Senator of Pennsylvania whose strong politically moderate stances helped President Dalton win the election as an independent. It is also mentioned in "Mitya" that she served at least two terms as a Pennsylvania State Senator.

In "Sound and Fury", Vice President Hurst becomes acting president of the United States for 2 months under Section 3 of the 25th Amendment when President Dalton takes a medical leave of absence. The longevity of her career is also hinted at as when President Dalton addresses the nation about the invocation of the 25th Amendment, he says that Hurst has been in politics and public life for 30 years.

=== Peter Harriman ===
A veteran of the United States Department of State, Ambassador Peter "Pete" Harriman (Skipp Sudduth) served as the United States Special Envoy for Sudan and South Sudan until his resignation in the fourth season. He was later appointed United States Ambassador to the United Nations, which he held throughout the fifth season. In 1998, Ambassador Harriman was serving at the United States Embassy in Kampala, Uganda, during the 1998 United States embassy bombings, during which he was cited for saving lives but lost his girlfriend.

Known as a cantankerous old man, Ambassador Harriman had a reputation as a man who inspired either "grudging respect" or "outright hostility" in others.

== List of politicians ==
=== American politicians ===
- Executive Branch
  - President of the United States:
    - Conrad Dalton (2013–2021)
    - Elizabeth McCord (2021–present)
    - Acting President of the United States:
      - Elizabeth McCord (October 4, 2015)
      - Teresa Hurst (January 14, 2018 – March 25, 2018)
  - Vice President of the United States:
    - Mark Delgado (2013–2017)
    - Teresa Hurst (2017–2021)
    - Carlos Morejon (2021–present)
  - White House Chief of Staff:
    - Russell Jackson (2013–2021)
    - Mike Barnow (acting, Jan-April 2021)
    - Jay Whitman (2021–present)
  - White House Press Secretary:
    - Daisy Grant (2021)
    - Angela Lopez (2021–present)
  - Personal Secretary to the President of the United States:
    - Lucy Knox (2015–2021)
    - Blake Moran (2021–present)
  - Counselor to the President:
    - Mike Barnow (2021–present)
  - White House Counsel:
    - Alex Jones (?-2021)
    - Olivia Mason (2021–present)
  - Secretary of State:
    - Vincent Marsh (2013–2014, killed)
    - Elizabeth McCord (2014–2019, resigned)
    - Assistant Secretary of State Susan Thompson (acting, 2019–2021)
    - Susan Thompson (2021–present)
  - Secretary of the Treasury:
    - Max Quinn (2013–2014)
    - Tom Brewer (2017–2021)
  - Secretary of Defense: Gordon Becker (2013–2021)
  - Attorney General:
    - Mary Campbell (2013–2015)
    - Louise Cronenberg (2015–2016)
    - Unknown (Shown in "French Revolution") (2016–2017)
    - Hank Nolan (2017–2021)
  - Secretary of the Interior
  - Secretary of Agriculture
  - Secretary of Commerce: Mary Wilford (2017–2021)
  - Secretary of Labor
  - Secretary of Health and Human Services
  - Secretary of Housing and Urban Development
  - Secretary of Transportation
  - Secretary of Energy: Singer (2018–2021) ("E Pluribus Unum")
  - Secretary of Education
  - Secretary of Veterans Affairs
  - Secretary of Homeland Security
  - National Security Advisor:
    - Darren Kahn (2013–2015, retired)
    - Craig Sterling (2015–2015, resigned)
    - ADM Ellen Hill, USN (Ret.) (2016–2021)
  - Director of National Intelligence: Ephraim Ware
- Legislative branch
  - United States Senators
    - Senator Gates, President pro tempore of the United States Senate (?–2015) ("The Show Must Go On")
    - Senator Beau Carpenter, Senate Majority Leader (?–2017, incarcerated)
    - United States Senator from Arizona Carlos Morejon, Chairman of the Senate Select Committee on Intelligence (2015–2019)
    - Senator Fred Reynolds
    - United States Senator from Kentucky Owen Callister, Chairman of the Senate Foreign Relations Committee (2018–present)
    - Senator Mark Hanson, Chairman of the Senate Intelligence Committee
    - United States Senator from Illinois Junston Parisi
    - United States Senator from Arizona Mark Stone
    - United States Senator Raymond Carruthers
    - United States Senator from Texas Kate Fletcher
  - United States House of Representatives
    - Congressman Everard Burke, Chairman of the House Appropriations Committee
- Judicial branch
  - Chief Justice of the United States Supreme Court: Frawley
- Other political appointments/officials
  - Chairman of the Joint Chiefs of Staff
    - ADM Ellen Hill, USN (Ret.) (2013–2015)
    - GEN Kelsey Reeves, US Army (2015–)
  - Director of the Central Intelligence Agency
    - Andrew Munsey (2013–2015)
    - Sean Williams (2015–2015)
    - Dennis Ellerman (2015–2016)
    - Hugh Haymond (2016–)
  - Director of the Federal Bureau of Investigation
    - Neil Hendricks (2013–2016)
    - Keith Doherty (2016–2019)
    - Amelia Banks (2021–present)
  - Deputy Director of the Federal Bureau of Investigation: Marguerite Sanchez (2015–)

==== Department of State personnel ====
- Secretary of State:
  - Vincent Marsh (2013–2014, killed)
  - Elizabeth McCord (2014–2019, resigned)
  - Susan Thompson (Acting, 2019–2021) (2021–present)
- Deputy Secretary of State:
  - Steven Cushing (2013–2019, retired)
  - Steven Bailey (2019–2019, resigned)
- Chief of Staff:
  - Nadine Tolliver (2013–2017, retired)
  - Jay Whitman (2017–2019)
- Personal assistant to the Secretary:
  - Blake Moran (2014–2018)
  - Nina Cummings (2018–present)
- Head speechwriter: Matt Mahoney (2013–2019)
- Press advisor: Daisy Grant (2013–2019)
- Policy advisor:
  - Jay Whitman (2013–2017)
  - Kat Sandoval (2017–2019)
- Assistant Policy Advisor: Blake Moran (2018–2019)
- Assistant Secretary of State for African Affairs: Susan Thompson (2014–2021)
- Assistant Secretary of State for East Asian and Pacific Affairs: Donna Parker (2014–present)
- Chief of Protocol: Ambassador Cyril Quist (2014–present)
- Ambassadors
  - United States Special Envoy for Sudan and South Sudan Peter Harriman (2014–2018, resigned)
  - United States Ambassador to the Republic of West Africa Odilon Bokassa. (S1 E06)
  - United States Ambassador to the Republic of Yemen Paul Wellington (2013–present)
  - United States Ambassador to the United Nations Peter Harriman (2018–2019, KIA)
  - United States Ambassador to Kyrgyzstan Julia MacDonald (2014–2017, resigned)
  - United States Ambassador to Myanmar Arlen Maxwell (2013–2016, fired)
  - United States Ambassador to Bulgaria Mitchell Williams (2014–present)
  - United States Ambassador to Canada Lester Clark. (S1 E05)
  - United States Ambassador to Mexico Rafael Lopez. (S1 E12)
  - United States Ambassador to Algeria Firas Kateb. (S1 E21)
  - United States Ambassador to Algeria Roy Curtis (2013–2016, deceased)
  - Special Representative Allen Bollings, Chief Negotiator for the Iranian Peace Talks (2013–2014, fired)
- Bureau of International Security and Non-proliferation Analyst Walter Novack

=== Foreign government officials ===
- Heads of State
  - President of Nicaragua
    - Mateo Sandino (1983–2014)
    - Mateo Sandino, Jr. (2018–present)
  - President of the Russian Federation
    - Pavel Ostrov (2009–2015, deceased)
    - Maria Ostrov (2015–2015, killed)
    - Maxim Salnikov (2016–present)
  - President of China Li (2014–present)
  - Prime Minister of Iraq Omar Arif (2014–present)
  - President of Venezuela Francisco Suarez (2014–2016, deceased)
  - King of Bahrain Naheed Obaid (2014–present)
  - President of Iran Najid Shiraz (2014–present)
  - President of Ukraine Mikhail Bozek (2014–present)
  - Prime Minister of India Jaya Verma (2014–present)
  - Prime Minister of the Islamic Republic of Pakistan
    - Khoosat (2014–2016, killed)
    - Konstantin Abedi (2016–present)
  - President of Algeria
    - Aman Haddad (2014–2016, incarcerated)
    - Mourad Cherat (2016–present)
  - President of Vietnam Nguyen Van Lanh (2014–present)
  - President of the Republic of Angola
    - Damiano Bestilo (2014–2016)
    - Bertilde Kalanga (2016–present)
  - Prime Minister of Israel Ido Aaronson (2014–present)
  - Prime Minister of Mongolia Byambyn Sendoo (2014–present)
  - President of Senegal Babacar Diome (2014–present)
  - President of Togo Silvanus Fabre (2014–present)
  - President of Timor-Leste Miguel Da Silva (2014–present)
  - President of Mexico Mario Zaragoza (2014–present)
  - President of Afghanistan Sharza (2014–present)
  - President of Sri Lanka Tarindo Nandasiri (2014–present)
  - President of Honduras Daphne Tejeda (2014–2018)
  - President of Turkey Kozlu (2014–present)
  - President of Poland Jozef Demko (2014–2019, resigned)
  - Prime Minister of Italy Enzo Moretti (2014–present)
  - President of Haiti
    - Hervé Dupont (2014–2018)
    - Claude Galbert (2018–present)
  - President of the French Republic Leon Perrin (2016–present)
  - President of the Philippines Datu Andrada (2017–present)
  - President of Kyrgyzstan Kenatbek Nogoyev (2017–present)
  - President of Myanmar U Khaing (2018–present)
  - President of the Republic of Nauru David Akua (2019–present)
- Foreign Ministers
  - French Minister of Europe and Foreign Affairs
    - Jean-Claude Dubois (2014–2016, retired)
    - Monique Beauvais (2016–present)
  - Foreign Minister of Russia
    - Anton Gorev (2014–2015, assassinated)
    - Konstantin Avdonin (2016–present)
  - Foreign Minister of the People's Republic of China Ming Chen (2014–present)
  - Foreign Secretary of India Chondita Samant (2014–present)
  - Minister of Foreign Affairs of the Republic of Turkey
    - Ozan Canoglu (2014–2015)
    - Hakan Uzan (2017–2018, fired)
    - Baran Tarhan (2018–present)
  - Foreign Minister of Ukraine Luka Melnick(2014–present)
  - Minister of Foreign Affairs of the Islamic Republic of Pakistan Konstantin Abedi (2014–2016, promoted)
  - Minister of Foreign Affairs of Tunisia Zuhair Mossadek (2014–present)
  - Minister of Foreign Affairs of the Socialist Republic of Vietnam Tran Chi Duc (2014–present)
  - Secretary of Foreign Affairs for Mexico Pedro Gomez (2014–2017, arrested)
  - Minister of Foreign Affairs of Iran
    - Zahed Javani (2015–2015, assassinated)
    - Tousi (2016–present)
- Ambassadors
  - Iranian Ambassador to the United Nations Zahed Javani (2014–2014, promoted)
  - Israeli Ambassador to the United States of America Lior Dori (2014–present)
  - Saudi Arabian Ambassador to the United States of America Prince Asim (2014–present)
  - Italian Ambassador to the United States of America Vittorio Civarelli (2014–present)
  - Cameroonian Ambassador to the United States of America Jean Aissatou (2014–present)
  - British Ambassador to the United States of America Graham Shenton
- Others
  - Defense Minister of Israel Weissberg (2014–present)
  - Education Minister of Afghanistan Amina Salah (2014–2017, stepped down)
