= Madam Secretary season 3 =

Season of television series

Madam Secretary
- Season 3
- DVD cover
- No. of episodes: 23

Release
- Original network: CBS
- Original release: October 2, 2016 – May 21, 2017

Season chronology
- ← Previous; Season 2 Next → Season 4

The third season of Madam Secretary, an American political drama television series, originally aired on CBS from October 2, 2016, through May 21, 2017. The season was produced by CBS Television Studios, with Barbara Hall as showrunner and executive producer. Madam Secretary was renewed for a third season on March 25, 2016.

The series follows Elizabeth McCord (Téa Leoni), the United States Secretary of State who, alongside President Conrad Dalton (Keith Carradine) and a dedicated staff led by Nadine Tolliver (Bebe Neuwirth), is instrumental in the shaping of a U.S. foreign policy. McCord is married to Henry (Tim Daly), a religious scholar and NSA handler.

== Cast and characters ==
=== Main ===
- Téa Leoni as Elizabeth McCord, the United States Secretary of State
- Tim Daly as Henry McCord, Elizabeth's husband and a National Security Agency operative
- Keith Carradine as Conrad Dalton, President of the United States
- Erich Bergen as Blake Moran, Elizabeth's personal assistant
- Patina Miller as Daisy Grant, Elizabeth's press coordinator
- Geoffrey Arend as Matt Mahoney, Elizabeth's speechwriter
- Sebastian Arcelus as Jay Whitman, Elizabeth's policy advisor
- Katherine Herzer as Alison McCord, Elizabeth and Henry's younger daughter
- Evan Roe as Jason McCord, Elizabeth and Henry's son
- Wallis Currie-Wood as Stephanie "Stevie" McCord, Elizabeth and Henry's older daughter
- Željko Ivanek as Russell Jackson, White House Chief of Staff
- Bebe Neuwirth as Nadine Tolliver, Elizabeth's chief of staff

=== Recurring ===
- Johanna Day as National Security Advisor Admiral (retired) Ellen Hill
- Tony Plana as Admiral Ed Parker, a member of the Joint Chiefs
- Clifton Davis as Ephraim Ware, Director of National Intelligence
- Mandy Gonzalez as Lucy Knox, President Dalton's aide
- J. C. MacKenzie as Governor Sam Evans of Pennsylvania, the presidential nominee for Dalton's party
- Francis Jue as Chinese Foreign Minister Chen
- Stephanie J. Block as Abby Whitman, Jay's wife.
- Justine Lupe as Ronnie Baker, a United States Army captain seconded from United States Cyber Command
- Chris Petrovski as Dmitri Petrov, a former Russian spy who joins the Central Intelligence Agency to work for Henry

=== Guests ===
- Morgan Freeman as Frawley, the Chief Justice of the United States
- Jane Pauley as herself
- Carlos Gómez as Jose Campos
- Monna Sabouri as the Interpreter, a Russian and Persian speaking agent
- Justin Baldoni as Kevin Park
- Joel de la Fuente as Datu Andrada, the President of the Philippines
- Christine Garver as Molly Reid

== Episodes ==
No. overall	No. in season	Title	Directed by	Written by	Original release date	U.S. viewers (millions)
46	1	"Sea Change"	Morgan Freeman	Barbara Hall	October 2, 2016	9.20
Elizabeth pushes Conrad to acknowledge the threat of climate change and adjust American foreign policy, which breaks with the party's stance. At the primary debate, Conrad's statements endorse Elizabeth's advocacy, and the party nominates Governor Evans, his opponent. Elizabeth and Conrad negotiate with the foreign minister of Tunisia to establish a base there to replace the one in Bahrain that had been devastated by a cyclone. Henry discovers photographs of their children in his backpack, with no idea how they got there or who took them. Elizabeth urges Conrad to run as an independent and with a different candidate for vice president.
47	2	"The Linchpin"	Eric Stoltz	David Grae	October 16, 2016	9.10
The US diplomat who had arranged for the dictatorial president of Algeria to step down to assuage the country's insurgents dies suddenly. The Algerian president reneges on the agreement and hangs the man who was to have taken his place. Elizabeth negotiates with the chief of Algeria's military forces to replace the president. Henry unsuccessfully attempts to save a monastery in Algeria from being destroyed by the terrorist group. A swatting at Jason's school and an ominous note left in his locker indicate that the anonymous threats against Elizabeth's family are escalating.
48	3	"South China Sea"	Rob Greenlea	Matt Ward	October 23, 2016	9.04
A group of young activists land on an atoll in the South China Sea to make a video protesting China's devastating construction there and are captured by the Chinese military. Elizabeth and Conrad visit Vietnam to discuss providing them with additional military hardware. Chinese fighter jets start flying too close to US naval ships in the South China Sea. When one of the planes misjudges the distance and hits a ship's tower, killing three sailors, Elizabeth convinces Conrad to talk directly with China's president before jumping directly to a military response. Their stalker terrorizes Elizabeth's family by hacking into their home and turning lights and appliances on and off.
49	4	"The Dissent Memo"	Felix Alcala	Joy Gregory	October 30, 2016	7.91
Members of the Bureau of African Affairs issue a dissent memo, disagreeing with the State Department's policies regarding corruption in the presidential election in Angola. Elizabeth works with the CEO of a messaging app to counteract the Angolan president's shutdown of the internet. His opponent is elected. Henry's team tries to locate the terrorist group by tracking sales of looted antiquities. They send in a US agent to impersonate a French archeologist who is involved in selling artifacts to terrorists. Although the meet goes well, the agent is kidnapped immediately afterward.
50	5	"The French Revolution"	Jonathan Brown	Moira Kirland	November 6, 2016	8.24
Diplomatic difficulties arise when France takes an American agent into custody just before a US state dinner for the French. Elizabeth is ultimately able to smooth things over by inviting France to join Five Eyes. With cooperation from French intelligence, the US attacks a site in Algeria where the terrorist leader and his lieutenants from different regions are meeting and is able to take into custody multiple terrorists, as well as their computers and other electronics. Elizabeth's office in the State Department is vandalized by their stalker. The FBI is able to identify the vandal and use him to bait the stalker into making a payment through an anonymous app while they are watching its traffic. The culprit, an influential and wealthy party member, is arrested.
51	6	"The Statement"	Jet Wilkinson	Alex Cooley	November 13, 2016	9.26
A radicalized Muslim blows himself up in an Illinois coffee shop, killing multiple other people as well. Elizabeth learns that the person who funded the suicide bomber's training is highly placed in the Saudi government. She attempts to pressure the Saudi ambassador to take action but fails. The media learn that her speechwriter, Matt, had donated money to the mosque that the suicide bomber attended in Illinois, and Conrad's opponents for president capitalize on that to anger their voter bases. Russell tries to force Matt to make a public statement. Matt and Jay are attacked in a bar. At a summit, Elizabeth ambushes the representative from Saudi Arabia with the mother of a young girl killed in the attack, and the publicity convinces the Saudi government to arrest the culprit. Dmitri and his sister are reunited.
52	7	"Tectonic Shift"	Arlene Sanford	Lyla Oliver	November 20, 2016	8.52
A major earthquake devastates Venezuela. The president and the others in line for the presidency are all killed. An international non-profit group of medical personnel fly into Venezuela to render aid and are taken prisoner by a gang. The dead president's son contacts the US, claiming the presidency and offering to free the hostages if the US will recognize his claim. Conrad and his presidential opponents record a fake news broadcast of Conrad recognizing the son's claim and his opponents criticizing his action, which is then played for the son. After the hostages are freed, the son discovers that the recognition was a hoax. Elizabeth's brother and his family visit while he interviews for a job at Walter Reed Hospital.
53	8	"Breakout Capacity"	James Whitmore Jr.	Alexander Maggio	November 27, 2016	8.97
The election is over: none of the presidential candidates have enough electoral college votes, so the election will be decided by the House of Representatives. Elizabeth learns that Russia may be expanding their nuclear program, but then finds out that a rogue Russian is shipping a nuclear centrifuge to Iran. The Navy stops the ships and recoups the centrifuge. UN inspectors fly in to Iran to inspect their facilities and are stopped by Iranian soldiers.
54	9	"Snap Back"	Sam Hoffman	Shalisha Francis	December 11, 2016	7.82
After Iran turns away the inspectors, Elizabeth scrambles to get the votes of the permanent members of the UN Security Council to reestablish the sanctions on Iran. From the Iranians being held by Russia, they learn that it was a dissenting member of the Iranian government who was trying to reestablish Iran's nuclear program. The Iranian ambassador tells Elizabeth that they will allow the inspectors in if Sam Evans takes back his claim that he intends to destroy the peace deal as soon as he takes office. Elizabeth is able to get Sam to admit that he does not really plan to do that while he is unknowingly on an open microphone. With the peace deal back in place, Russia releases the Iranians, but their plane is shot down by an unknown militant group. Elizabeth and Conrad suspect Israel. Russell collapses in his office.
55	10	"The Race"	Eric Stoltz	David Grae	December 18, 2016	9.05
Russell is rushed into surgery for a bypass. Iran fires missiles at Israel; Israel counters by decimating an Iranian military base. Iran takes the Israeli minister of defence hostage. Israel sends planes to bomb a nuclear facility in Iran, but the US prevents it by using a cyberattack to take their navigational satellite offline. Elizabeth and Conrad manage to get Iran and Israel to discussions. Conrad gives a rousing speech, after which the president of Iran and prime minister of Israel shake hands. The House of Representatives elects Conrad as president for another term.
56	11	"Gift Horse"	Jonathan Brown	Barbara Hall	January 8, 2017	9.00
The 6th Circuit Court of Appeals agrees to hear Sam Evans's case against Conrad's inclusion on the Ohio ballot. Elizabeth receives a horse from Mongolia as an inauguration gift. China calls it a bribe and accuses the U.S. of taking sides in an upcoming referendum in Mongolia. Russia hacks a U.S. animal organization's website to leak the information that the horse, which Elizabeth cannot accept, will be killed if returned to Mongolia. Russell tells Evans that if he does not retract the suit, he will release the information about Evans's DNA test that shows he has the gene for early onset Alzheimer's. Stevie, as Russell's intern, is tasked with escorting the poet laureate who will speak at the inauguration. He gets drunk and argues with Jareth about the usefulness of poetry, then ends up putting Jareth's defense of quantum physics in the poem. Allie chooses Elizabeth's dress for the inaugural ball, then rethinks her choice. Henry convinces the head of a phone company to help the NSA track information related to terrorism.
57	12	"The Detour"	Martha Mitchell	Matt Ward	January 15, 2017	7.54
The FBI learns that the man who built the bomb for the suicide bomber (Note: As seen in "The Statement") was a member of the Covenant of John cult (Note: As seen in "The Time is at Hand") and has built a second bomb. Henry is brought in to speak to him. The FBI begin interviewing surviving members of the cult. Elizabeth, on a trip to African nations, discovers that Foreign Minister Chen from China is ahead of them throughout their itinerary, and that he is convincing other countries to give their power contracts to China. She and her team are grounded in Togo by a plane malfunction. Learning that Togo has rich phosphate deposits, she convinces the Togo government to set sustainability and women's education requirements as a condition for allowing China to mine there. One of the cult survivors who had been interviewed by the FBI makes a call, and a truck loaded with the second bomb is put into motion.
58	13	"The Beautiful Game"	Felix Alcala	Joy Gregory	January 29, 2017	8.71
Elizabeth hosts representatives from Israel and Iran at Camp David to move forward with the peace negotiations, but talks fall apart when Iran reneges on its previous agreement to acknowledge Israel's right to exist. Henry mentors an ex-military ATF agent who will go undercover with the Covenant of John cult. Jay has marital troubles. An Israeli fanatic explodes a bomb, killing 25 people, including the rabbi who had negotiated a goodwill soccer game between Iranian and Israeli youth. Jordan refuses to host the game after the bomb, so Elizabeth and her team fly everyone to the United States to play.
59	14	"Labor of Love"	Charlotte Brandstrom	Moira Kirland	March 5, 2017	7.44
The government of Colombia and a left-wing rebel group it has been fighting for 50 years are prepared to agree to a peace treaty, largely influenced by the Romeo and Juliet-like romance between the president's son and the rebel leader's daughter. As a result, the US is about to enact a memorandum of understanding with several South American countries. The agreement falls apart when the rebel leader's daughter disappears, leaving a Dear John letter for her fiance. Elizabeth convinces the daughter to reconsider, and she and her fiance convince their parents to recommit to the peace deal. Daisy discovers Kevin, the budgeting employee that she is dating, dead in his office. Elizabeth tells her that Kevin was actually a CIA operative and that they believe he was murdered. Jay discovers that his wife is seeing a friend of his. Henry watches by remote camera as the agent that he is handling is restrained and then submerged in water as a "baptism" ceremony by the militia group.
60	15	"Break in Diplomacy"	Maggie Greenwald	Lyla Oliver	March 12, 2017	8.23
The newly elected president of the Philippines has a busted nose after touching Elizabeth inappropriately. The US learns that he has been taking payments from China. Elizabeth uses those secret payments to convince him to reaffirm the relationship between the Philippines and the US. Henry's asset Ian survives the baptism. He is unable to find the bomb but discovers that the military group has a military drone. When he is discovered in the shed with the drone, Ian is forced to kill one of the militia members.
61	16	"Swept Away"	Felix Alcala	Alex Cooley	March 19, 2017	7.62
Henry's team fakes the manner of the militia member's death to take suspicion off Ian. Their attempt is successful and Ian is made a member of the Council of Elders. Elizabeth meets with the Dalai Lama, who tells her he is dying. His visit angers China, who threaten the failure of the proposed climate agreement. India also balks at the agreement until Elizabeth offers an amendment that will help India bring electricity to rural citizens. Conrad intimidates a junior senator who is trying to scuttle the climate agreement on behalf of one of his donors.
62	17	"Convergence"	James Whitmore Jr.	Alexander Maggio	March 26, 2017	8.77
With information that Ian provides, Henry is able to connect the militia's drone to the same arms smuggler that Elizabeth is trying to track down. Trap software helps the FBI locate the State Department employee who is altering the manifests for planes carrying the stolen weapons. Just as the mole is about to tell Elizabeth who hired him, his lawyer shows up and ends the interrogation. Elizabeth's team puts together a plan to reduce the market for rhino horns by advertising Viagra in Vietnam, hoping it will help end rhino poaching in Namibia. The lawyer reaches an agreement with the Justice Department to release his client in exchange for information; the mole is assassinated as they leave the building. Henry discovers that Ian is being drugged and intends to pull him out of the field, but is fired upon by militia guards when he goes to meet Ian.
63	18	"Good Bones"	Rob Greenlea	Joy Gregory	April 9, 2017	7.58
An investigation into sex trafficking is stymied by the lack of cooperation from the president of Kyrgyzstan. Elizabeth convinces him to help with the investigation by getting a young actress that he admires to travel to Kyrgyzstan for his birthday party. The investigation is able to rescue emprisoned women in several countries, but they discover a large group of women in an abandoned truck in Kyrgyzstan in which all of the women had suffocated, including an American missionary who had been kidnapped the year before. Ian calls Henry from a mall, saying that he had been sent on a supply run, but when Henry gets there, he discovers that the militia had placed the bomb in the back of the truck Ian was driving. Henry drives the truck to an empty field where the bomb explodes without injuring anyone. The FBI raid the militia compound, but the senior leadership is not on site at the time.
64	19	"Global Relief"	Jet Wilkinson	Moira Kirland	April 23, 2017	7.87
The family anxiously awaits news on which college accepts Ally and whether Stevie gets into Harvard Law. A severe drought in Somalia is exacerbated by violence between two opposing rebel groups who are both claiming the last arable land in the region. An ex-State Department employee who now works for an NGO delivering food to the area tries to broker a ceasefire between the two groups and is taken hostage. Elizabeth makes a deal with an arms dealer to get a ceasefire so that the region can receive food supplies and a security group can retrieve the hostage. The plan is ultimately successful, but the weapons that the security group captures indicate that that arms dealer is the one who stole the weapons from the US. Henry hypothesizes that the militia leadership may be planning to bomb Al-Aqsa Mosque. The FBI learns that several of its members have already left the US.
65	20	"Extraordinary Hazard"	Charlotte Brandstrom	Mark Steilen	April 30, 2017	7.88
The U.S. freezes the assets of the Georgian arms deal that they suspect of stealing American weapons and in retaliation he takes Jay hostage while Jay is meeting with a Russian accountant who has information about the arms dealer. Further investigation leads Elizabeth to believe that they suspect the wrong man. She convinces the arms dealer to release Jay, promising that the U.S. will not pursue him any further. A group of Americans track down and assassinate the arms dealer, but the CIA assures Elizabeth that it was not their operation. Eventually, they discover that the leader of an American security company that Elizabeth has worked with several times is the person responsible for the weapons thefts, as well as the murders of the two State Department employees and the weapons dealer, and he is arrested.
66	21	"The Seventh Floor"	Deborah Reinisch	Matt Ward	May 7, 2017	7.58
Daisy reveals that she is pregnant. Jay sleeps with a Brazilian reporter. Mike B. continues to pursue Nadine. The State Department has to figure out how to get Sudan to release an American reporter whom they have held prisoner for years. Elizabeth tasks Matt with writing an inspiring speech to put pressure on Sudan, and also on China, as they believe that Sudan arrested the reporter initially at China's behest. The journalist is freed.
67	22	"Revelation"	Jonathan Brown	David Grae	May 14, 2017	7.83
Intelligence learns that the remaining militia members and their Al-Qaeda companions are attempting to cross into Israel by tunnel with the military drone and biological weapon. When watchers radio the terrorists that Israeli forces are blocking the tunnel exit, the Al-Queda members shoot the militia members and flee with the weapons. In Jerusalem, Henry interrogates the militia member who survived the shooting and learns that the new target might be in Rome. Elizabeth and Conrad are in Rome for a G-20 meeting. A drone is aimed at Vatican City but the Americans take control of it and crash it. Bioweapons experts at the crash site say there is no evidence of a biological weapon, leading Elizabeth to conclude that the real target is the G-20 assemblage of leaders. Terrorists release the aerosolized weapon but the HVAC system is shut down and they are the only ones infected by the weapon. Stevie realizes that she does not want to go to Harvard. Blake tells Elizabeth that he is bisexual.
68	23	"Article 5"	Eric Stoltz	Barbara Hall	May 21, 2017	7.44
Russia invades Bulgaria. Elizabeth's attempt to invoke Article 5 of the NATO treaty is blocked by France. With Dmitri's help, Henry obtains proof that France's recently elected president secretly took money from Russia. The second attempt to obtain agreement to take military action to repel Russia's incursion succeeds. Elizabeth convinces Russia to return the remains of an American who was killed in Ukraine and mistakenly buried in Russia.

== Production ==
=== Development ===
Madam Secretary was renewed for a third season on March 25, 2016.

== Ratings ==
Viewership and ratings per episode of Madam Secretary season 3
No.	Title	Air date	Rating/share (18–49)	Viewers (millions)	DVR (18–49)	DVR viewers (millions)	Total (18–49)	Total viewers (millions)
1	"Sea Change"	October 2, 2016	1.1/4	9.20	—N/a	2.78	—N/a	11.97
2	"The Linchpin"	October 16, 2016	1.1/4	9.10	—N/a	2.69	—N/a	11.79
3	"South China Sea"	October 23, 2016	1.1/3	9.04	—N/a	2.90	—N/a	11.95
4	"The Dissent Memo"	October 30, 2016	0.8/2	7.91	—N/a	2.87	—N/a	10.78
5	"The French Revolution"	November 6, 2016	1.0/3	8.24	—N/a	3.06	—N/a	11.30
6	"The Statement"	November 13, 2016	1.0/3	9.26	—N/a	2.89	—N/a	12.15
7	"Tectonic Shift"	November 20, 2016	1.0/3	8.52	—N/a	3.07	—N/a	11.58
8	"Breakout Capacity"	November 27, 2016	1.0/3	8.97	0.5	3.06	1.5	12.03
9	"Snap Back"	December 11, 2016	0.7/2	7.82	0.5	2.86	1.2	10.68
10	"The Race"	December 18, 2016	1.1/4	9.05	0.5	3.00	1.6	12.05
11	"Gift Horse"	January 8, 2017	0.9/3	9.00	0.5	3.03	1.4	12.03
12	"The Detour"	January 15, 2017	0.7/2	7.54	0.5	2.91	1.2	10.45
13	"The Beautiful Game"	January 29, 2017	0.9/3	8.71	—N/a	2.65	—N/a	11.36
14	"Labor of Love"	March 5, 2017	0.8/3	7.44	—N/a	—N/a	—N/a	—N/a
15	"Break in Diplomacy"	March 12, 2017	0.8/3	8.23	—N/a	2.52	—N/a	10.75
16	"Swept Away"	March 19, 2017	0.8/3	7.62	—N/a	2.47	—N/a	10.09
17	"Convergence"	March 26, 2017	1.1/4	8.77	—N/a	2.39	—N/a	11.17
18	"Good Bones"	April 9, 2017	0.8/3	7.58	—N/a	2.46	—N/a	10.04
19	"Global Relief"	April 23, 2017	0.7/3	7.87	0.5	2.71	1.2	10.58
20	"Extraordinary Hazard"	April 30, 2017	0.7/3	7.88	—N/a	—N/a	—N/a	—N/a
21	"The Seventh Floor"	May 7, 2017	0.7/3	7.58	—N/a	2.47	—N/a	10.05
22	"Revelation"	May 14, 2017	0.7/3	7.83	0.5	2.75	1.2	10.59
23	"Article 5"	May 21, 2017	0.7/3	7.44	—N/a	2.75	—N/a	10.19

== Home media ==
The DVD release of season three is set to be released in Region 1 on September 19, 2017.

The Complete Third Season
Set details			Special features
23 episodes; 991 minutes (Region 1); 6-disc set; 1.78:1 aspect ratio; Languages: English; Subtitles: English (Region 1)			Deleted Scenes
Release dates			Deleted Scenes
United States	United Kingdom	Australia	Deleted Scenes
September 19, 2017	September 25, 2017		Deleted Scenes
