= Madam Secretary season 2 =

Season of television series

Madam Secretary
- Season 2
- DVD cover
- No. of episodes: 23

Release
- Original network: CBS
- Original release: October 4, 2015 – May 8, 2016

Season chronology
- ← Previous; Season 1 Next → Season 3

The second season of Madam Secretary an American political drama television series originally aired in the United States on CBS from October 4, 2015, through May 8, 2016. The season was produced by CBS Television Studios, with Barbara Hall as showrunner and executive producer. Debuting on September 21, 2014, the series was renewed for a second season on January 12, 2015. Madam Secretary was renewed for a third season on March 25, 2016.

The series follows Elizabeth McCord (Téa Leoni), a former CIA analyst and professor who becomes United States Secretary of State at the behest of President Conrad Dalton (Keith Carradine) after her predecessor is killed in a plane crash. Elizabeth works alongside a dedicated staff, including Nadine Tolliver (Bebe Neuwirth).

== Cast and characters ==
=== Main ===
- Téa Leoni as Elizabeth McCord, the U.S. Secretary of State
- Tim Daly as Henry McCord, Elizabeth's husband and an N.S.A. operative
- Keith Carradine as Conrad Dalton, President of the United States
- Erich Bergen as Blake Moran, Elizabeth's personal assistant
- Patina Miller as Daisy Grant, Elizabeth's press coordinator
- Geoffrey Arend as Matt Mahoney, Elizabeth's speechwriter
- Kathrine Herzer as Alison McCord, Elizabeth and Henry's younger daughter
- Evan Roe as Jason McCord, Elizabeth and Henry's son
- Wallis Currie-Wood as Stephanie "Stevie" McCord, Elizabeth and Henry's older daughter
- Željko Ivanek as Russell Jackson, White House Chief of Staff
- Bebe Neuwirth as Nadine Tolliver, Elizabeth's Chief of Staff

=== Recurring ===
- Sebastian Arcelus as Jay Whitman, Elizabeth's policy advisor
- Jill Hennessy as Jane Fellows, Henry's former DIA handler and Ishbal Jahed task force member
- Carlos Gómez as Jose Campos, an Ishbal Jahed task force member
- Francis Jue as Chinese Foreign Minister Chen
- Angela Gots as Russian President Maria Ostrov
- Mandy Gonzalez as Lucy Knox, President Dalton's aide

=== Guests ===
- Morgan Freeman as Frawley, the Chief Justice of the United States
- Julian Acosta as Craig Sterling
- Madeleine Albright as herself, the first woman U.S. Secretary of State
- Kate Burton as Maureen McCord-Ryan, Henry's sister
- Jane Pauley as herself

== Episodes ==
No. overall	No. in season	Title	Directed by	Written by	Original release date	U.S. viewers (millions)
23	1	"The Show Must Go On"	Morgan Freeman	Barbara Hall	October 4, 2015	11.79
Air Force One communications are lost and through a series of events, Elizabeth is sworn in as acting president. The plane lands safely. She learns that Craig Sterling has been appointed National Security Adviser. Her staff performs in her place at the Pacific Rim Economic Forum. The president and his staff learn that the communications problem on Air Force One was a deliberate attack.
24	2	"The Doability Doctrine"	Eric Stoltz	David Grae	October 11, 2015	11.15
Rumors circulate about the Russian president's well-being. A State Department employee in Kabul is taken prisoner by Afghan contractors who have been threatened by the Taliban. Elizabeth convinces the president to fly the contractors' families out of Afghanistan. A SEAL team, sent to rescue the American and the contractors, is only able to retrieve the American. The Russian minister asks Elizabeth and Henry to look after his daughter at Harvard, and says he is returning to Moscow because their president is dead. Henry convinces Dmitri to spy for the US. Stevie takes the LSAT. Harrison tells his parents that he had heroin in his pocket.
25	3	"The Rusalka"	Dennie Gordon	Matt Ward	October 18, 2015	9.61
Elizabeth attends the funeral in Russia. Her attempt to broker peace between Russia and Ukraine is destroyed by the president's widow. Dmitri becomes paranoid after Henry subjects him to a test of his discretion. The president is informed that the hack of Air Force One actually gave the hackers complete control of every system on the plane, not just the communications.
26	4	"Waiting for Taleju"	Felix Alcalá	Joy Gregory	October 25, 2015	10.81
A disgruntled ex-Secret Service agent tries to sell nude photos of Harrison and Stevie. Henry is interviewed on CPSAN2 about his book and annihilates a caller who uses the photos to attack Henry's morality. The photo controversy stops a disaster relief bill for Nepal. Sterling and Dalton are concerned that a Chinese weather station in the Arctic is a front for spying.
27	5	"The Long Shot"	Rob J. Greenlea	Moira Kirland	November 1, 2015	9.47
Jay pitches a plan to combat Russian disinformation in eastern Europe. Dmitri tells Henry of a plan to take Olga Gorev to the Russian embassy, and Henry takes her to his home to protect her. Elizabeth learns the identity of the hacker who attacked Air Force One, but not who he is working for. Gorev is assassinated. Dmitri informs the Americans that when Maria is elected president of Russia, she will invade western Ukraine.
28	6	"Catch and Release"	Charlotte Brandstrom	Alex Cooley	November 8, 2015	10.59
An American-born ISIS leader kills an American aid worker. The State Department evacuates American NGO workers, including Elizabeth's brother, a surgeon. Elizabeth's staff identify the ISIS leader as the son of a State Department employee. Elizabeth uses information that she gains from the employee and from her brother to identify a courier providing black-market medicine to the ISIS leader. The military follow the courier with a drone, and kill the ISIS leader and the courier with a missile.
29	7	"You Say You Want a Revolution"	Tate Donovan	Joan Rater & Tony Phelan	November 15, 2015	10.61
With an opportunity to end the trade embargo with Cuba, Elizabeth and Russell convince the president to support their efforts. Sterling, who disagrees, goes behind their backs to scuttle the plan. When the deal hinges on a 1960s revolutionary who Cuba refuses to return, Elizabeth offers the woman a new trial and a chance to have her message heard across the country. She gives herself up, the embargo is lifted, and the U.S. reopens its embassy after 54 years.
30	8	"Lights Out"	Dennie Gordon	Alexander Maggio	November 22, 2015	9.91
Elizabeth, Russell, and Mike B. enact a strategy that forces Sterling to resign. Dmitri, having returned to Russia, is transferred to the GRU. He sends back intelligence about Russia's plans to invade Ukraine. The president receives confirmation that Russia was behind the attack on Air Force One and okays a major retaliatory cyberstrike on Moscow. Dmitri tries to escape to Sweden.
31	9	"Russian Roulette"	Jonathan Brown	Barbara Hall	November 29, 2015	9.96
The president of Russia retaliates for the power system hack by shutting down the oil pipelines to Europe. Henry is convinced that Russia was not behind the hack of Air Force One, but Russell refuses to listen to his concerns or to let him speak to the president. Elizabeth vets the intelligence that supported Russia as the culprit and begins to have doubts herself. After Henry secretly shares his information with Elizabeth, she determines that Ukraine hacked Air Force One and faked an attack on their own plane so that the U.S. would back Ukraine against a Russian invasion.
32	10	"The Greater Good"	Eric Stoltz	David Grae	December 13, 2015	10.14
Rapidly increasing hostilities between Russia, Ukraine, and the U.S. lead to global concern. The parties eventually agree to meet in Switzerland. A peace agreement is nearly scuttled when Maria demands that the U.S. apologize publicly for the cyberattack. In a private conversation, Dalton tells Maria that if she does not sign the agreement, he will reveal to the world that she murdered her husband. Maria points out that she cannot back down without some form of gain to explain to her generals, and demands that Dalton reveal the name of the U.S. asset on her staff. Dmitri, in place to be extracted by the Americans, is instead taken into custody by the Russians. After the agreement is signed and the parties begin to depart, a man in camouflage uniform fires a missile into one of the waiting vehicles.
33	11	"Unity Node"	Jet Wilkinson	Matt Ward	January 10, 2016	8.97
Marie Ostrev dies from the missile explosion. The attacker is identified as Zelinsky from Ukraine. Russia considers the attack a violation of the agreement. The Americans locate and extract Zelinsky, hoping that Ukraine will turn Zelinsky over to Russia so that the peace agreement can stay in place. Henry, Elizabeth, and Dalton are notified of Dmitri's death. Elizabeth learns that debris from a North Korea satellite launch has damaged the International Space Station and that three of the astronauts on board are trapped. She convinces China to provide modular Extravehicular Mobility Units to Russia to send to the space station.
34	12	"The Middle Way"	James Whitmore Jr.	Lyla Oliver	January 17, 2016	11.87
While Elizabeth is in Myanmar for the signing of the Pacific Rim Trade Agreement, Henry deals with irate neighbors at home. Nadine accompanies Elizabeth to attempt to reunite with her estranged son. The U.S. ambassador to Myanmar, after being removed from his post, takes the Myanmar president hostage in protest of the treaty. Elizabeth is able to salvage the agreement. Blake is in despair at the doomsday predictions of "The World in 2030" report.
35	13	"Invasive Species"	Tony Phelan	Moira Kirland	January 31, 2016	10.20
Henry's father dies and the family travels to Pittsburgh to attend the funeral. A detective informs Henry that his father died by suicide. Jason goes through his grandfather's computer and discovers that he was being catfished, sending all of his money to a fake internet persona. Blake tracks down the email address, and the family learns that the perpetrator was a friend of Henry's father, who was desperate for money. Henry and his sister Maureen argue over their father's cause of death, but ultimately reconcile. Russell tasks Elizabeth's team with working on a cross-agency task force on invasive water species. Nadine discovers that a paragraph of their cross-agency task force report on East Africa has been redacted by the CIA. Russell admits to Nadine that he authorized it in order to hide details of a senator taking campaign donations from a company associated with the Chinese government.
36	14	"Left of the Boom"	Rob Greenlea	Joy Gregory	February 14, 2016	10.06
Uranium is stolen in Moldova. A military raid to halt the sale of the stolen uranium ends badly. Two American girls, who had attempted to join a terrorist group, are taken into custody by Saudi Arabia. Elizabeth, who is hosting a conference on women's education, is instructed not to attend the keynote by a Saudi Arabian woman who had been attacked with acid for speaking out against gender segregation in the workplace, because it might interfere with a pending arms deal with Saudi Arabia. Saudi Arabia returns the girls, and FBI interrogation learns that they were supposed to have been part of an attack on the keynote speaker. Learning of this, Elizabeth orders the conference shut down. Henry and their children, who attended the conference, evacuate just before a woman forces her way past security into the conference room and blows herself up. The children are taken to the hospital to check for radiation exposure, while Henry goes back in to help the injured.
37	15	"Right of the Boom"	Jonathan Brown	Alexander Maggio	February 21, 2016	10.73
In the aftermath of the explosion, Henry is taken to the hospital's isolation unit due to radiation exposure. The US bombs a location where they believe Disah, the head of the terrorist group is, but learn afterwards that he was somewhere else. Elizabeth convinces Dalton that they need a special task force dedicated to locating and shutting down this terrorist group. Dalton asks Henry to join the task force.
38	16	"Hijriyyah"	Charlotte Brandstrom	Alex Cooley	March 6, 2016	10.19
One of Henry's team travels to Syria to meet with an asset to get information about the location of Disah. She is killed when the asset blows himself up at the meeting. The bomb was detonated remotely, and they realize that he was under duress. His last word was "Hijriyyah", which turns out to be the name of Disah's most recent wife, and the team thinks she might be the key to locating Disah. Stevie cooks dinner to introduce Jareth to her family, but both of her parents have to miss it.
39	17	"Higher Learning"	Heather Cappiello	Kelly Jane Costello	March 20, 2016	9.41
Protests in Chile and the U.S. bring Hercutel's mining operations on a glacier in Chile to a halt. Hugo, a member of the indigenous tribe that lives on the glacier, live-streams his hike to its peak to draw attention to the destruction that Hercutel will cause. Elizabeth, Stevie, Blake, and Allison visit a potential college for Allison. A group of angry protestors confront Elizabeth on campus. Their leader, after Elizabeth's bodyguard stops him from approaching her, files a lawsuit against the State Department. Elizabeth gets him to withdraw the lawsuit by calling his parents. Learning that Chile's contract with Hercutel violated their agreement with their indigenous population, Elizabeth proposes an alternate mining method which would preserve the glacier. Hercutel decides to mine in Argentina instead. Hugo is caught up in an avalanche but is rescued. Henry convinces a local immigrant who was a teacher in Syria to contact her old student, Hijriyyah, who responds with a cryptic message that Henry's team hopefully interprets as meaning that she might work with them.
40	18	"On the Clock"	Zetna Fuentes	Barbara Hall and David Grae	March 27, 2016	8.50
Peace talks between prime ministers from India and Pakistan in Washington D.C. are halted when it is learned that a Pakistani plane carrying a hydrogen bomb crashed in India. Elizabeth negotiates between the two sides to return the bomb to Pakistan. Elizabeth's team try unsuccessfully to convince the Bulletin of the Atomic Scientists not to change the Doomsday Clock. Henry's team emails Hijriyyah an attachment that, when she opens it, will let them identify her precise location.
41	19	"Desperate Remedies"	Rob Greenlea	Matt Ward	April 10, 2016	9.86
A representative from the U.S. fails to negotiate a release of young girls who had been kidnapped by Boko Haram and returns with Marburg fever. Elizabeth arranges with the government of Cameroon to send in medical personnel to contain the outbreak, under the protection of Cameroonian forces. A man claiming to be sick blows himself up inside the medical station, killing 7. Doctors try an experimental drug on the American negotiator and cure him, but there are only three doses remaining. Elizabeth sends the now-healed negotiator to obtain the release of the schoolgirls and protection for medical teams by offering the head of Boko Haram one of the doses, as he is now deathly ill. Henry's team discover a tunnel between the compound where they believe Hijriyyah is and the gas station where an informant saw Disah. They attempt to kill Disah with a drone missile, but the plan is leaked and Disah escapes. U.S. troops use the tunnel to capture Hijriyyah.
42	20	"Ghost Detainee"	Charlotte Brandstrom	Moira Kirland	April 17, 2016	9.57
Troubled by nightmares, Henry checks up on Dmitri's sister and learns that she has been arrested in Russia. She turns down his attempts to help her. Hijriyyah says she will help Henry's team find Disah after they kill her father, who frightens her more than Disah does. Elizabeth negotiates with the Russian Prime Minister to form a coalition to deal with the terrorist group, agreeing that the U.S. will veto any Eastern European applications to join NATO for five years and gaining Russia's cooperation in finding Hijriyyah's father. The U.S. kills Hijriyyah's father and she tells them where Disah planned to go. Elizabeth has to have her favorite horse put down.
43	21	"Connection Lost"	Jonathan Brown	Joy Gregory	April 24, 2016	9.57
Elizabeth and Henry go to her therapist for marriage counseling. Elizabeth plants some disinformation with Pakistan's foreign minister and Henry's team determine that it was passed immediately on to Disah and the terrorist group, who begin buying explosives. Conrad and Elizabeth inform the prime minister of his foreign minister's doings, and also warn him that the terrorists have planted explosives along the route for tomorrow's parade. The foreign minister tweets that the prime minister agreed to allow the U.S. to monitor its nuclear weapons, and the populace rises up in outrage. Henry's team, in Islamabad to try to locate Disah, stay behind when the embassy is evacuated. The prime minister is pulled from his vehicle and killed by a mob of protestors. Conrad authorizes a proposal to secure Pakistan's nuclear weapons.
44	22	"Render Safe"	Felix Alcala	David Grae	May 1, 2016	9.90
While Islamabad explodes with violent demonstrations, the foreign minister announces that he is taking over as prime minister. The U.S. and Russia put Render Safe into action, an operation to take control of Pakistan's nuclear arsenal. The Russian ambassador later informs Elizabeth that Russia has decided to recognize the new regime and will not be fulfilling their part of the operation. The terrorist group captures six nuclear weapons. The U.S. locates the vehicle the terrorists are using and recapture the weapons. Henry's team locates Disah and is able to call in a drone strike on his vehicle, but Jose is wounded. They hide out in a grocery store. The grocery store owner fetches a doctor to patch up Jose, and the team is able to make it to the extraction point. Elizabeth asks the Russian ambassador about releasing Dmitri's sister, and he proposes exchanging her for a spy that the U.S. is holding. When Elizabeth points out that it is hardly an equitable trade, a spy for an innocent girl, the ambassador suggests including Dmitri in the exchange, implying that he is still alive.
45	23	"Vartius"	Eric Stoltz	Barbara Hall	May 8, 2016	9.99
Stevie and Jareth get engaged. Matt fills in for Elizabeth as graduation speaker. Elizabeth confronts Conrad when she learns that he has chosen a new Secretary of State, only to learn that he wants her to be his vice-president in the upcoming campaign. Conrad agrees on the prisoner exchange. Henry and Dmitri are reunited.

== Production ==
=== Development ===
Madam Secretary was renewed for a second season on January 12, 2015. Madam Secretary was renewed for a third season on March 25, 2016.

=== Casting ===
Madeleine Albright appeared in a guest capacity as herself, Jill Hennessy joined the cast in a recurring role as Jane Fellows, and Chris Petrovski was cast in a recurring role as Dmitri Petrov.

== Broadcast ==
Season two of Madam Secretary premiered on October 4, 2015.

== Ratings ==
Viewership and ratings per episode of Madam Secretary season 2
No.	Title	Air date	Rating/share (18–49)	Viewers (millions)	DVR (18–49)	DVR viewers (millions)	Total (18–49)	Total viewers (millions)
1	"The Show Must Go On"	October 4, 2015	1.4/4	11.79	—N/a	—N/a	—N/a	—N/a
2	"The Doability Doctrine"	October 11, 2015	1.5/4	11.15	—N/a	—N/a	—N/a	—N/a
3	"The Rusalka"	October 18, 2015	1.2/3	9.61	—N/a	—N/a	—N/a	—N/a
4	"Waiting for Taleju"	October 25, 2015	1.3/4	10.81	—N/a	—N/a	—N/a	—N/a
5	"The Long Shot"	November 1, 2015	1.1/3	9.47	—N/a	—N/a	—N/a	—N/a
6	"Catch and Release"	November 8, 2015	1.3/4	10.59	—N/a	—N/a	—N/a	—N/a
7	"You Say You Want a Revolution"	November 15, 2015	1.4/4	10.61	—N/a	—N/a	—N/a	—N/a
8	"Lights Out"	November 22, 2015	1.1/3	9.91	—N/a	—N/a	—N/a	—N/a
9	"Russian Roulette"	November 29, 2015	1.3/3	9.96	0.3	2.41	1.6	12.37
10	"The Greater Good"	December 13, 2015	1.3/4	10.14	—N/a	2.14	—N/a	12.28
11	"Unity Node"	January 10, 2016	1.0/3	8.97	0.5	2.54	1.5	11.51
12	"The Middle Way"	January 17, 2016	2.0/6	11.87	0.6	2.70	2.6	14.56
13	"Invasive Species"	January 31, 2016	1.1/3	10.20	—N/a	2.15	—N/a	12.35
14	"Left of the Boom"	February 14, 2016	1.2/4	10.06	—N/a	—N/a	—N/a	—N/a
15	"Right of the Boom"	February 21, 2016	1.2/4	10.73	—N/a	—N/a	—N/a	—N/a
16	"Hijriyyah"	March 6, 2016	1.1/4	10.19	—N/a	2.31	—N/a	12.51
17	"Higher Learning"	March 20, 2016	1.1/3	9.41	—N/a	2.17	—N/a	11.58
18	"On the Clock"	March 27, 2016	1.0/3	8.50	—N/a	2.37	—N/a	10.87
19	"Desperate Remedies"	April 10, 2016	1.1/4	9.86	—N/a	—N/a	—N/a	—N/a
20	"Ghost Detainee"	April 17, 2016	0.9/3	9.57	—N/a	—N/a	—N/a	—N/a
21	"Connection Lost"	April 24, 2016	1.0/3	9.57	—N/a	—N/a	—N/a	—N/a
22	"Render Safe"	May 1, 2016	1.0/4	9.90	—N/a	2.00	—N/a	11.94
23	"Vartius"	May 8, 2016	1.0/4	9.99	—N/a	—N/a	—N/a	—N/a

== Home media ==
The DVD release of season two is set to be released in Region 1 on September 13, 2016.

The Complete Second Season
Set details			Special features
23 episodes; 995 minutes (Region 1); 6-disc set; 1.78:1 aspect ratio; Languages: English (Dolby Digital 5.1); Subtitles: English (Region 1)			Under Surveillance: The Making of Madam Secretary; Madam Secretary at the Politico Playbook Panel; Deleted Scenes; Gag Reel
Release dates			Under Surveillance: The Making of Madam Secretary; Madam Secretary at the Politico Playbook Panel; Deleted Scenes; Gag Reel
United States	United Kingdom	Australia	Under Surveillance: The Making of Madam Secretary; Madam Secretary at the Politico Playbook Panel; Deleted Scenes; Gag Reel
September 13, 2016	September 26, 2016	October 26, 2016	Under Surveillance: The Making of Madam Secretary; Madam Secretary at the Politico Playbook Panel; Deleted Scenes; Gag Reel
