= Madam Secretary season 5 =

Season of television series

Madam Secretary
- Season 5
- No. of episodes: 20

Release
- Original network: CBS
- Original release: October 7, 2018 – April 21, 2019

Season chronology
- ← Previous; Season 4 Next → Season 6

The fifth season of Madam Secretary an American political drama television series, originally aired in the United States on CBS from October 7, 2018, through April 21, 2019. This season was produced by CBS Television Studios, with Barbara Hall and Lori McCreary serving as showrunner and executive producer, respectively. Madam Secretary was renewed for a fifth season on April 18, 2018. In May 2019, Madam Secretary was renewed for a sixth and final season.

== Cast and characters ==
=== Main ===
- Téa Leoni as Elizabeth McCord, the United States Secretary of State
- Tim Daly as Henry McCord, Elizabeth's husband and a Central Intelligence Agency operative
- Erich Bergen as Blake Moran, Elizabeth's personal assistant and later deputy policy advisor.
- Željko Ivanek as Russell Jackson, White House Chief of Staff
- Wallis Currie-Wood as Stephanie "Stevie" McCord, Elizabeth and Henry's older daughter; later, Dmitri's girlfriend
- Patina Miller as Daisy Grant, Elizabeth's press coordinator
- Evan Roe as Jason McCord, Elizabeth and Henry's son
- Geoffrey Arend as Matt Mahoney, Elizabeth's speechwriter
- Katherine Herzer as Alison McCord, Elizabeth and Henry's younger daughter
- Keith Carradine as Conrad Dalton, President of the United States
- Sebastian Arcelus as Jay Whitman, Elizabeth's chief of staff (Previously policy advisor)
- Sara Ramirez as Kat Sandoval, Elizabeth's new policy advisor
- Chris Petrovski as Dmitri Petrov, a former Russian spy who joins the Central Intelligence Agency to work for Henry

=== Guests ===
- Madeleine Albright as herself, a former U.S. Secretary of State
- Hillary Clinton as herself, a former U.S. Secretary of State
- Colin Powell as himself, a former U.S. Secretary of State

== Episodes ==
No. overall	No. in season	Title	Directed by	Written by	Original release date	U.S. viewers (millions)
91	1	"E Pluribus Unum"	Eric Stoltz	Barbara Hall & David Grae	October 7, 2018	6.13
After an incident of Hindu violence against Muslims in India, Elizabeth gets word that Pakistan might be willing to discuss a mutual anti-nuclear agreement with India, so she convinces Conrad that the US should pursue the agreement rather than attack India's tepid response to the violence. Henry, speaking at an academic symposium, harshly criticizes India's actions, leading that country's leadership to withdraw their willingness to discuss anything with Pakistan. Elizabeth cobbles together a package of trade enticements to lure them back to the table, and an agreement is quickly reached. As dignitaries gather to sign the memorandum, an American white supremacy group attacks the Oval Office with an RPG. Stevie is seriously injured and June, Russell's acting secretary, is killed. Later, the signing is completed and Elizabeth speaks about the dangers of nationalism as opposed to patriotism.
92	2	"The Chaos Game"	Felix Alcala	Joy Gregory	October 14, 2018	5.48
A man associated with the white supremacy group that fired the RPG at the White House is arrested with bomb-making materials in his vehicle. Some of the administration members want to hold him as a domestic terrorist, while others point out that the statutes are not written to apply to citizens arrested within the country. Elizabeth learns that he was in correspondence with a far-right politician in Poland, and asks the Polish government to make that person available for questioning, but the president of Poland balks because of the danger it poses to his government. When evidence emerges that the Polish politician is being funded by Russia, the president agrees to assist with a rendition, but the politician is discovered dead from apparent suicide. Conrad asks Henry to become his ethics advisor.
93	3	"The Magic Rake"	John Murray	Matt Ward	October 21, 2018	5.80
A clothing factory in Italy burns down, killing many of its workers, just before Milan Fashion Week. Italy absolves itself of blame because the factory is owned by China and the workers were also from China. Elizabeth decides to accept Italy's invitation to attend Fashion Week in hopes of reviving interest in a global fair labor agreement. She convinces Conrad to sign off on a complaint against China for the factory disaster; China responds by setting tariffs against the United States. Foreign Minister Chen implores Elizabeth to hold off on making further statements against China, as he has been given indications that he might be selected as the next president. Elizabeth and EU representatives give a press conference about the fair labor agreement and she pointedly draws attention to China's absence. Chen learns that President Li has decided to appoint himself to another five-year term. Against orders, Chen visits the site of the disaster and leaves flowers at a small shrine set up outside. Henry decides to become the president's ethics advisor. Elizabeth tells Mikey B. that her domestic issue as a presidential candidate will be criminal justice reform.
94	4	"Requiem"	Eric Stoltz	Keith Eisner	October 28, 2018	5.56
President Andrada of the Philippines refuses to repatriate the remains of American servicemen until his country receives an aid and weapons package. The bill authorizing the package is being held up in committee by a senator who intends to run for president and wants to make things difficult for Elizabeth as his future opponent. Henry and Stevie are refused service at a restaurant owned by a friend of the senator. Ali becomes disillusioned when a politician who she has been campaigning for compromises on an issue. Elizabeth travels to the Philippines to pressure Andrada. The servicemen's remains are returned to the United States.
95	5	"Ghosts"	Rob Greenlea	Lyla Oliver	November 4, 2018	5.23
Henry attends a conference on religious freedom in Thailand to support an old friend, a Thai national who is now an American citizen, but Henry is horrified when Rochana speaks against the monarchy and is swiftly arrested. When Henry attends the king of Thailand's birthday celebration as a representative of the U.S. president, he pleads with the king to pardon Rochana. To Henry's surprise, the pardon is granted, but Henry and Rochana are stopped at a checkpoint on their way to the airport. The king has died and the military no longer recognizes the pardon. Rochana is scheduled for execution and Henry is imprisoned. Conrad authorizes a black ops extraction for them both. Mike B. encourages Elizabeth to write a book, even arranging for a ghostwriter for her. A super PAC runs an ad encouraging Elizabeth to run for president; she and Henry finally tell their children of her intention to run.
96	6	"Eyjafjallajökull"	Geoffrey Arend	Alexander Maggio	November 11, 2018	5.10
As thousands of refugees attempt to flee the civil war in Syria, Turkey closes its borders because pledges to the United Nations to compensate Turkey are short by $5 billion. Elizabeth's team's attempts to find more funds fail. On the way home, an Icelandic volcano eruption causes Elizabeth's plane to be grounded in Ireland, along with the plane of Turkey's diplomats and that of the Dutch national chess team. From a member of the chess team, Jay learns that the Russian representative to the world chess tournament might be cheating. Elizabeth is able to use that information to convince China to make a pledge for Turkey; their example leads other nations under their influence to follow suit. Although the pledges are still $2 billion short of the goal, Turkey agrees to open its borders if the United States will support its request for a seat on the Security Council.
97	7	"Baby Steps"	Kevin Dowling	Kristi Korzec	November 18, 2018	5.52
Laos cracks down on human trafficking, which by their laws includes surrogates. Caught up in the sweep is a woman carrying a child for the vice president's son and daughter-in-law. Elizabeth attempts to form an international coalition to set global standards for surrogacy but her efforts are pre-empted when the media accuses the vice president of support for sex trafficking. The vice president leads a group of American couples connected to the Laotian surrogates to Laos. After she officially apologizes for the American bombings of Laos during the Vietnam war, the government releases the surrogates bearing American children. A grand opening for the peace garden gifted by Japan to the United States is in jeopardy when the park service states that they lack the budget to follow Japan's care and maintenance instructions. Blake convinces a businessman who has been trying to bribe his way into a meeting with Elizabeth to sponsor the garden. Stevie gets a letter from Dmitri.
98	8	"The Courage to Continue"	Sam Hoffman	Matt Chester	November 25, 2018	5.24
The newly-elected president of Haiti visits the White House, but the incumbent president refuses to recognize the election results and instigates a coup. Elizabeth juggles incentives and threats to resolve the situation. Eventually, the incumbent agrees to take refuge in Monaco. Blake is appointed as a policy advisor on Elizabeth's staff.
99	9	"Winter Garden"	Eric Stoltz	Joy Gregory	December 9, 2018	5.35
A summit to discuss letting Kosovo and Serbia join NATO is derailed when Spain rescinds its support because of sudden threats of independence for Catalonia. Internet claims that a large mass grave has been discovered in Kosovo raises tensions. More news stories inflame the populace of Kosovo and result in violence against Serbians. The US identifies a Russian-sponsored troll farm behind the onslaught of fake news stories and takes it down, then presents their intelligence to the representatives from Kosovo and Serbia to help them realize how they were being manipulated. Blake uses a similar tactic (identifying a common enemy) to bring together two departments that had been unwilling to cooperate on a malaria prevention program. Henry has to file a report when Gordon comes to their house late at night in a delusional state, which results in the White House physician, who had given Gordon pills to help him sleep, being asked to resign.
100	10	"Family Separation"	Rob Greenlea	Barbara Hall & David Grae	December 23, 2018	6.60
101	11	"Family Separation"	Martha Mitchell	Barbara Hall & David Grae	January 6, 2019	5.44
Part 1: Arizona begins separating children from their parents who enter the United States illegally and refuses to grant Mexican diplomats access to the detainees. Failing to obtain a preliminary injunction in federal court, Dalton agrees to let Elizabeth go to Arizona to escort the Mexican ambassador into the children's holding facility. When the governor forces them to leave, Elizabeth speaks to the press and protestors about the appalling conditions she found inside. At the governor's direction, the sheriff arrests Elizabeth. Part 2: Elizabeth declines a plea deal and asks the judge to keep her in jail until the detained immigrant children are reunited with their parents. A wave of public support for her stance helps Jay and a marijuana legalization lobbyist convince Senator Morejon to sponsor a bill to address the border separation policy in Arizona, as well as a bill proposing legalization of marijuana as a tool to combat illegal immigration. Henry and Elizabeth have their vow renewal ceremony in jail. The bill supporting family reunification passes; children and parents are reunited; Elizabeth is released from jail. At a celebratory party, at which Peter Frampton performs, Elizabeth tells her staff members that she will be running for president.
102	12	"Strategic Ambiguity"	Eric Stoltz	Matt Ward	January 13, 2019	6.02
Fossor, the company that is supplying the Department of Defense with 80 F-40 fighter jets, says that in order to meet the budget and timeline, they need to sell 100 units. Conrad proposes that Taiwan buy the other 20. Elizabeth points out that China will see the move as unprovoked aggression. A spy for Fossor obtains a copy of the top secret memo analyzing the sale and leaks it to China. Minister Chen conveys China's outrage to Elizabeth. When it is learned that it was Fossor behind the leak, Conrad notifies the CEO that he is cancelling the F-40 contract. Elizabeth and Russell brief a small group of senators on the corporate espionage, but the senators are beholden to the jobs created by the F-40 project and plan to vote for a spending bill rider that will reinstate the contract. The Department of Justice becomes aware of massive corruption by Fossor and arrests its CEO. Fossor agrees that the US only needs to buy 80 F-40s.
103	13	"Proxy War"	Felix Alcala	Keith Eisner	January 27, 2019	5.38
When a cluster bomb kills 29 children in Syria, suspicion falls on Israel, as only the U.S. is known to manufacture cluster bombs. An investigation reveals that the bomb was made in Russia, which had hacked the blueprints from the poorly safeguarded computer system of the U.S. manufacturer, run by a friend of Conrad's. Israel provokes Syria into shooting down a Russian plane filled with soldiers. Russia responds by sending an armada to establish a port in Syria, which the U.S. resolves to prevent with its own fleet of ships. Elizabeth desperately attempts to find a diplomatic solution. Henry and Russell clash over Henry's role in Conrad's administration. Jason's foray into cryptomining nearly triples the household energy bill.
104	14	"Something Better"	Charlotte Brandstrom	Sara Ray	February 17, 2019	4.99
During a violent uprising in Nicaragua, a group of American missionaries escape the violence by take refuge in a church, but are unable to leave or seek medical treatment for their wounded. Conrad is oddly hesitant to take any action. Elizabeth is unable to convince Nicaragua's president to cooperate. Elizabeth learns that years ago, Conrad worked at the CIA station in Nicaragua and the president blames Conrad for the death of his mother in an explosion. Conrad convinces the president's father, the beloved former president, to intervene, and he rallies the people to protect those inside the church. Stevie tries to make Russell appear warm and personable as his social media account manager. Although it seems to backfire, Russell realizes afterward that her tactics helped him get a children's health care bill passed.
105	15	"Between the Seats"	Sam Hoffman	Lyla Oliver	March 3, 2019	5.19
An agreement between the U.S. and Afghanistan goes awry when a video of Matt talking with a young Afghani woman on the plane goes viral. She seeks protection at the U.S. embassy to avoid the members of her family who intend to enact an honor killing. The government of Afghanistan refuses to sign the agreement unless the woman is returned to her family, and the State Department cannot continue to protect her since she refuses to request asylum. Matt and the woman's chaperone on the flight meet with her father and uncle to explain how the video was misinterpreted. She is married off and the agreement goes forward. Elizabeth's brother Will and his wife separate and he moves in to Elizabeth's house.
106	16	"The New Normal"	Felix Alcala	Alexander Maggio	March 17, 2019	5.43
The Pacific island nation of Nauru is devastated by a typhoon, and scientists predict that another storm will render it uninhabitable. Elizabeth convinces an actor to donate his private island to the people of Nauru in exchange for forgiveness of his tax debt by the IRS. Henry speaks to an evangelical group about climate change, annoying the influential leader of the group who immediately donates to an opponent of Elizabeth in the next presidential race. The leader's daughter, spokesperson for the group, chooses to give public support to efforts to acknowledge and confront climate change. Mike B., furious at Henry's speech, quits Elizabeth's campaign. Later, Elizabeth comforts him as he says goodbye to Gordon, his dog. A second typhoon hits Nauru and the population is rescued before the island disappears.
107	17	"The Common Defense"	Martha Mitchell	Kristi Korzec	March 24, 2019	4.92
While Elizabeth holes up at Camp David to write a speech, Jay takes lead at a United Nations roundtable focused on climate migration. Returning from a cruise, Daisy is quarantined when her daughter develops the measles. Jay suggests that the State Department examine vaccination status of applicants for new passports and renewals, which Conrad supports but Russell does not. Will gets his own apartment.
108	18	"Ready"	Sunu Gonera	Matt Chester	March 31, 2019	4.99
A treaty on climate migration is threatened when Poland reverses its support due to right-wing extremists in its government. Elizabeth asks Lena, an old colleague and an academic from Poland who is also a U.S. permanent resident, to speak to the symposium at the United Nations. After Lena agrees, she is shot in Poland, and U.S. intelligence indicates that the shooters were Polish intelligence agents. When the president of Poland refuses to release Lena to the U.S., Elizabeth convinces Conrad to authorize an extraction. That violation of Polish sovereignty exacerbates relations between the two countries. More eastern European countries withdraw from the treaty. Henry and Elizabeth learn that Ali is dating Senator Morejon's son. Henry and Morejon agree that their children should be off-limits during the upcoming campaign. Morejon swings enough votes to support sanctions against Poland, bringing the country back to the table on the treaty. Lena addresses the symposium. Russell tells Elizabeth that she is ready to declare for the presidency, and she gives Conrad her notice of resignation.
109	19	"The Great Experiment"	Eric Stoltz	Joy Gregory	April 14, 2019	4.98
An article is published, speculating that Elizabeth and Conrad had an affair when they worked at the CIA. The governor of Massachusetts asks Elizabeth to run as the GOP candidate. Nina tells Kat of her reluctance to work for the Deputy Secretary of State who will be taking Elizabeth's place when she announced her candidacy. Kat learns more about the concerns that female employees have about the Deputy and confronts him. He resigns. Elizabeth struggles with the Rohingya situation in Myanmar and suggests to Conrad that they declare it a genocide.
110	20	"Better Angels"	John Murray	Matt Ward	April 21, 2019	4.79
After all the major countries, including Russia and China, agree to the climate migration treaty, a terrorist group attacks a dinner of the UN Security Council with sarin gas, killing all the attendees. Conrad turns down Elizabeth's request to withdraw her resignation. The Department of Justice and FBI launch an investigation into presidential-candidate Senator Callister and he withdraws from the race. Blake and Stevie kiss. Elizabeth publicly announces that she is running for president.

== Production ==
Madam Secretary was renewed for a fifth season on April 18, 2018. On May 9, 2019, it was renewed for a sixth season. On May 15, it was revealed the sixth season, to consist of 10 episodes, would be the series' last.

== Broadcast ==
Season five of Madam Secretary premiered on October 7, 2018.

== Ratings ==
Viewership and ratings per episode of Madam Secretary season 5
No.	Title	Air date	Rating/share (18–49)	Viewers (millions)	DVR (18–49)	DVR viewers (millions)	Total (18–49)	Total viewers (millions)
1	"E Pluribus Unum"	October 7, 2018	0.6/3	6.13	0.4	2.92	0.9	9.05
2	"The Chaos Game"	October 14, 2018	0.6/3	5.48	0.4	3.13	1.0	8.62
3	"The Magic Rake"	October 21, 2018	0.6/3	5.80	0.4	2.82	1.0	8.62
4	"Requiem"	October 28, 2018	0.6/3	5.56	0.3	2.70	0.9	8.27
5	"Ghosts"	November 4, 2018	0.5/2	5.23	0.4	2.80	0.9	8.04
6	"Eyjafjallajökull"	November 11, 2018	0.6/3	5.10	0.4	2.83	1.0	7.94
7	"Baby Steps"	November 18, 2018	0.6/3	5.52	0.3	2.56	0.9	8.08
8	"The Courage to Continue"	November 25, 2018	0.6/3	5.24	0.3	2.85	0.9	8.10
9	"Winter Garden"	December 9, 2018	0.6/3	5.35	0.3	2.88	0.9	8.24
10	"Family Separation: Part 1"	December 23, 2018	0.8/4	6.60	0.2	1.88	1.0	8.48
11	"Family Separation: Part 2"	January 6, 2019	0.6/3	5.44	0.3	2.66	0.9	8.10
12	"Strategic Ambiguity"	January 13, 2019	0.6/3	6.02	0.4	2.66	0.9	8.68
13	"Proxy War"	January 27, 2019	0.5/3	5.38	0.3	2.91	0.9	8.30
14	"Something Better"	February 17, 2019	0.4/2	4.99	0.4	2.71	0.8	7.71
15	"Between the Seats"	March 3, 2019	0.6/3	5.19	—N/a	2.80	—N/a	7.99
16	"The New Normal"	March 17, 2019	0.5/3	5.43	0.3	2.58	0.8	8.02
17	"The Common Defense"	March 24, 2019	0.5/3	4.92	0.2	2.29	0.8	7.21
18	"Ready"	March 31, 2019	0.6/3	4.99	0.3	2.39	0.9	7.38
19	"The Great Experiment"	April 14, 2019	0.4/2	4.98	0.2	2.34	0.6	7.33
20	"Better Angels"	April 21, 2019	0.4/2	4.79	0.3	2.43	0.7	7.23
