= Madam Secretary season 6 =

Season of television series

Madam Secretary
- Season 6
- No. of episodes: 10

Release
- Original network: CBS
- Original release: October 6 – December 8, 2019

Season chronology
- ← Previous; Season 5

The sixth and final season of Madam Secretary, an American political drama television series, originally aired in the United States on CBS from October 6, 2019, through December 8, 2019. This season was produced by CBS Television Studios, with Barbara Hall and Lori McCreary serving as showrunner and executive producer, respectively. The series received its sixth-season renewal in May 2019.

== Cast and characters ==
=== Main ===
- Téa Leoni as Elizabeth McCord, President of the United States
- Tim Daly as Henry McCord, Elizabeth's husband and a Central Intelligence Agency operative
- Erich Bergen as Blake Moran, Elizabeth's personal assistant and later deputy policy advisor
- Željko Ivanek as Russell Jackson, White House Chief of Staff
- Wallis Currie-Wood as Stephanie "Stevie" McCord, Elizabeth and Henry's older daughter; later, Dmitri's girlfriend
- Patina Miller as Daisy Grant, Elizabeth's press coordinator
- Evan Roe as Jason McCord, Elizabeth and Henry's son
- Geoffrey Arend as Matt Mahoney, Elizabeth's speechwriter
- Katherine Herzer as Alison McCord, Elizabeth and Henry's younger daughter
- Keith Carradine as Conrad Dalton, a previous president of the United States
- Sebastian Arcelus as Jay Whitman, Elizabeth's chief of staff (previously a policy advisor)
- Sara Ramirez as Kat Sandoval, Elizabeth's new policy advisor
- Chris Petrovski as Dmitri Petrov, a former Russian spy who joins the Central Intelligence Agency to work for Henry

=== Guests ===
- Madeleine Albright as herself, a former U.S. secretary of State
- Hillary Clinton as herself, a former U.S. secretary of State
- Colin Powell as himself, a former U.S. secretary of State
- Ali Olomi as Baddar Nabi

== Episodes ==
No. overall	No. in season	Title	Directed by	Written by	Original release date	U.S. viewers (millions)
111	1	"Hail to the Chief"	Eric Stoltz	Barbara Hall & David Grae	October 6, 2019	4.77
President McCord's first major bill is ESI (education, science, and infrastructure). Her efforts to convince enough senators to support it are hampered after she announces that the government of Iran had interfered with the election and the chairman of the Senate Intelligence Committee announces an investigation into her compaign. Flashbacks to her campaign show how she convinced Senator Carlos Morejon to join her ticket as vice president. Mike B., who agreed to serve as Elizabeth's chief of staff for the first 100 days, pressures her to select his replacement. Elizabeth offers the position to Russell who gladly comes out of retirement. ESI passes. Members of Elizabeth's staff receive subpoenas from the Senate.
112	2	"The Strike Zone"	Felix Alcala	Joy Gregory	October 13, 2019	4.51
The Senate investigative committee interrogates Mike B. about events during the campaign. Blake sets Stevie up on blind date. After the passage of the ESI bill, citizens protest the increase in gas taxes, and Elizabeth decides to look for a different revenue stream over Russell's protests. Elizabeth throws out the first pitch at a baseball game.
113	3	"Killer Robots"	Rob Greenlea	Keith Eisner	October 20, 2019	4.34
The terrorist mastermind behind the assassination of the UN Security Council is located. Elizabeth is presented with three options: bombing (with a strong chance of collateral civilian deaths), a SEAL team incursion (risking deaths of American servicemen), and an autonomous armed vehicle (colloquially referred to as a "killer robot"). Although her military advisors recommend the autonomous vehicle, Elizabeth sends in the SEALs. The terrorist is captured, but the surface-to-air missile takes out the helicopter, killing many of the SEAL team. The Senate investigative committee interrogates Blake. Henry finds a new dog for the family. Elizabeth is able to announce to the public that the U.S., Russia, and China have agreed to work together for a complete ban on autonomous weapons.
114	4	"Valor"	James Whitmore Jr.	Lyla Oliver	October 27, 2019	3.99
Elizabeth presents the Medal of Honor to retired Marine Major Jenkins. Henry asks the major to speak before the Senate committee considering a bill to modernize VA mental health care, but the committee turns them away at the request of Morejon. The major, who is suffering from depression and PTSD, loses control during a minor fender bender and pretends to go for a gun, leading police to shoot him. Henry reads to the committee the speech that the major was going to give. The bill passes. Daisy testifies before the investigative committee. Stevie sees Dmitri again.
115	5	"Daisy"	Rob Greenlea	Alexander Maggio	November 3, 2019	3.82
Daisy tells the FBI about receiving a thumb drive containing information about Elizabeth's opponent in the presidential race. The reporter who wrote the story is jailed for refusing to appear in response to a subpoena from the Department of Justice. Conrad, staying at the White House for the unveiling of his official portrait, does an interview promoting his new children's album and announces that he has taken a position with UNICEF. Henry and Stevie attend Dmitri's naturalization ceremony. Elizabeth accepts Daisy's resignation and pardons the reporter who later confirms to Elizabeth that Daisy was not her source for the story.
116	6	"Deepfake"	Leslie Libman	Matt Chester	November 10, 2019	3.90
A deepfake video, purportedly of Elizabeth and Henry, threatens to scuttle a trade agreement with South Korea. Although they were able to convince the president of South Korea that the video was fake, he is now hesitant to commit to the agreement. Henry, while entertaining the president's wife, learns that a relaxation of rules forbidding South Korean software in the U.S. might sway the president. Senator Hansen implies to Morejon that he may pursue impeachment of Elizabeth. Stevie and Dmitri resume their relationship.
117	7	"Accountability"	Darnell Martin	Leland Jay Anderson	November 17, 2019	4.14
The FBI executes a search warrant on Blake's apartment. One of the items they take is a flash drive containing opposition research on Elizabeth, given to Blake by a reporter, and the contents are almost immediately leaked to the public. The individuals behind the Iranian cyberhacking during the election are identified. When Iran refuses to extradite them, Elizabeth sanctions an extraction of the leader. Hanson addresses the Senate on the progress of his investigation, and says that he is referring it to the House of Representatives for action. Elizabeth and Henry force Jason to apologize publicly for ill-considered statements he made to a college journalist who had a published a column attacking Elizabeth. Stevie and Dmitri appear together in public.
118	8	"Ships and Countries"	Sam Hoffman	Joy Gregory	November 24, 2019	4.25
An American tech billionaire visiting Russia is taken prisoner and held in the Iranian embassy in Moscow. Elizabeth convinces the Russian president to pressure the Iranians to transport him to Tehran. When the plane lands at Incirlik Air Base to refuel, American soldiers surround it. Elizabeth makes a deal with Iranian officials that if they release the American, their plane will be allowed to depart for Iran. Elizabeth tells Henry that she wants to testify before the House committee.
119	9	"Carpe Diem"	Felix Alcala	David Grae	December 1, 2019	4.23
Elizabeth's testimony to the House Judiciary Committee is interrupted when China attacks a U.S. Navy ship in the South China Sea, killing 24 sailors. The U.S. sets up a blockade around a contested island, and both countries increase their defense readiness conditions. Unable to reach any understanding with the president of China, Elizabeth takes Marine One to New York to speak with Minister Chen, who admits to her that the attack was not authorized by the president but was an action taken by a rogue commander. Elizabeth and Chen work out that if the U.S. remove their ships from the blockade line while maintaining firing capability on any Chinese ship crossing the line, it will allow President Li to save face without the U.S. backing down. Stevie and Dmitri get engaged. When Elizabeth resumes her testimony, one of the members of the committee erupts at the chairman's baseless accusations and calls the hearings a hatchet job before storming out. The committee holds an emergency session to vote against impeachment. Public protests in support of her presidency take place across the country.
120	10	"Leaving the Station"	Eric Stoltz	Barbara Hall	December 8, 2019	4.53
Two days before Stevie and Dmitri's wedding, their venue burns down, so the ceremony is moved to the White House. Russell tells Elizabeth that he and Carol have separated. Elizabeth announces that she is proposing the Equal Rights Amendment again. Conrad officiates the wedding ceremony and Peter Frampton performs "Show Me the Way" for the first dance. Russell reconciles with Carol by resigning as chief of staff. Jay becomes the new chief of staff and tells Elizabeth that although they will have enough votes in both houses to pass the amendment, popular support is divided. Elizabeth and Henry departed on a whistle-stop train tour to encourage ratification.

== Production ==
On May 9, 2019, Madam Secretary was renewed for a sixth season. On May 15, it was revealed the sixth season, to consist of 10 episodes, would be the last.

== Broadcast ==
The sixth season of Madam Secretary premiered on October 6, 2019.

== Ratings ==
Viewership and ratings per episode of Madam Secretary season 6
No.	Title	Air date	Rating/share (18–49)	Viewers (millions)	DVR (18–49)	DVR viewers (millions)	Total (18–49)	Total viewers (millions)
1	"Hail to the Chief"	October 6, 2019	0.4/2	4.77	0.3	2.69	0.7	7.46
2	"The Strike Zone"	October 13, 2019	0.5/3	4.51	—N/a	2.72	—N/a	7.23
3	"Killer Robots"	October 20, 2019	0.4/2	4.34	0.2	2.36	0.6	6.70
4	"Valor"	October 27, 2019	0.4/2	3.99	0.2	2.49	0.6	6.48
5	"Daisy"	November 3, 2019	0.4/2	3.82	0.3	2.58	0.7	6.40
6	"Deepfake"	November 10, 2019	0.3/2	3.90	—N/a	2.40	—N/a	6.30
7	"Accountability"	November 17, 2019	0.4/3	4.14	—N/a	2.42	—N/a	6.56
8	"Ships and Countries"	November 24, 2019	0.4/2	4.25	—N/a	2.25	—N/a	6.50
9	"Carpe Diem"	December 1, 2019	0.5/3	4.23	—N/a	2.47	—N/a	6.70
10	"Leaving the Station"	December 8, 2019	0.5/3	4.53	—N/a	2.55	—N/a	7.08
