= Madam Secretary season 4 =

Season of television series

Madam Secretary
- Season 4
- No. of episodes: 22

Release
- Original network: CBS
- Original release: October 8, 2017 – May 20, 2018

Season chronology
- ← Previous; Season 3 Next → Season 5

The fourth season of Madam Secretary an American political drama television series originally aired in the United States on CBS from October 8, 2017, through May 20, 2018. This season was produced by CBS Television Studios, with Barbara Hall and Lori McCreary as showrunner and executive producer, respectively. Debuting on September 21, 2014. Madam Secretary was renewed for a fifth season on April 18, 2018.

== Cast and characters ==
=== Main ===
- Téa Leoni as Dr. Elizabeth McCord, the United States Secretary of State
- Tim Daly as Dr. Henry McCord, Elizabeth's husband and a Central Intelligence Agency operative
- Keith Carradine as Conrad Dalton, President of the United States
- Erich Bergen as Blake Moran, Elizabeth's personal assistant
- Patina Miller as Daisy Grant, Elizabeth's press coordinator
- Geoffrey Arend as Matt Mahoney, Elizabeth's speechwriter
- Sebastian Arcelus as Jay Whitman, Elizabeth's policy advisor and later chief of staff
- Sara Ramirez as Kat Sandoval, Elizabeth's new policy advisor
- Kathrine Herzer as Alison McCord, Elizabeth and Henry's younger daughter
- Evan Roe as Jason McCord, Elizabeth and Henry's son
- Wallis Currie-Wood as Stephanie "Stevie" McCord, Elizabeth and Henry's older daughter; later, Dmitri's girlfriend
- Željko Ivanek as Russell Jackson, White House Chief of Staff
- Chris Petrovski as Dmitri Petrov, a former Russian spy who joins the Central Intelligence Agency to work for Henry
- Bebe Neuwirth as Nadine Tolliver, Elizabeth's chief of staff

=== Guests ===
- Morgan Freeman as Frawley, the Chief Justice of the United States
- Yuval David as Matvey Sokolov, a Russian special agent
- Christine Ebersole as Lydia Dalton, the first lady of the United States
- Keone Young as Minister Myambyn Sendoo
- Elpidia Carrillo as President Daphne Tejeda

== Episodes ==
No. overall	No. in season	Title	Directed by	Written by	Original release date	U.S. viewers (millions)
69	1	"News Cycle"	Morgan Freeman	Barbara Hall	October 8, 2017	7.21
Elizabeth meets with a representative from Timor-Leste who dies before telling her why he wanted to meet. Conspiracy theorists on the internet accuse Elizabeth of murder. Elizabeth discovers that the government of Timor-Leste has been corrupted by a Mexican drug cartel, and the murder was to prevent exposure. The U.S. helps Timor-Leste rid itself of the cartel members in its country. Dmitri passes a lie detector test so that he can work for Henry. He tells his sister that he was able to hide his drug addiction because of his training in Russia which enabled him to fool a lie detector test.
70	2	"Off the Record"	Eric Stoltz	David Grae	October 15, 2017	6.36
While Elizabeth is in Libya to attempt to stop a reignited civil war, a vehicle in her motorcade hits a young girl who ran into the road. The child's brain swelling is more severe than the local hospital can treat. Elizabeth begs the members of the two sides to grant a one-hour ceasefire, long enough for a helicopter to transport the girl to a nearby U.S. Navy medical ship. The surgeon on the ship is able to reduce the brain swelling. The Libyan opponents, moved by the situation, agree to work toward a peace agreement. Dmitri snaps at his two co-workers, then confesses his opiate addiction to Henry.
71	3	"The Essentials"	Charlotte Brandstrom	Matt Ward	October 22, 2017	6.43
Elizabeth negotiates with the Lebanese ambassador and an Israel solar power company to get a solar grid installed at a refugee camp. Henry's boss at the CIA gets Dmitri admitted to an agency-approved rehabilitation facility. Budget negotiations between Conrad and the adversarial Senator Morejon are unable to prevent a government shutdown. Nadine, learning that she is going to be a grandmother, gives Elizabeth her notice as she prepares to join her son and his partner in California.
72	4	"Shutdown"	Felix Alcala	Joy Gregory	October 29, 2017	5.83
With the government shut down, Elizabeth lacks the staff and funds to deal with an Ebola outbreak. Senator Morejon releases a political ad that attacks Dalton on immigration. Elizabeth travels to a toy factory in Peoria, Illinois, that is staffed by Honduran immigrants, to highlight the value of immigrants to the country. Henry visits Dmitri in rehab to run some intelligence by him. Elizabeth chooses Jay to replace Nadine as her chief of staff. After Russell informs her of his plans to destroy Morejon, Elizabeth tells the senator of the plan and advises him to accept the president's budget offer. Morejon agrees, ending the shutdown. Stevie pulls out of a visit to England with Jareth at the last minute.
73	5	"Persona Non Grata"	John Murray	Alexander Maggio	November 5, 2017	5.92
The US ambassador to Kyrgyzstan is forcibly removed from the country and declared persona non grata for having an affair with the president's brother-in-law. The US later discovers that her lover was a Russian spy and that her computer had been compromised. Henry, who is in Afghanistan to set up a safe house, tells his team to evacuate when he learns that the ambassador to Afghanistan has communicated the safe house's location to the compromised ambassador's email. The team escapes just before the safe house explodes. Stevie confesses that Jareth ended their engagement just before modeling Ali's dress for Ali's mid-term.
74	6	"Loophole"	Maggie Greenwald	Moira Kirland	November 12, 2017	6.63
Nasifa, a member of Henry's team, is captured by the Taliban, who offer to release her for payment. Henry is frustrated by the policy that the US does not negotiate with terrorists. Elizabeth's team puts together a round-robin deal that results in Nasifa's release. Henry and his team are determined to find out who betrayed them. In his new role as chief of staff, Jay sets boundaries with Matt. Daisy has a baby girl. Stevie, having moved out of her apartment with Jareth, encounters Dmitri and gives him her number.
75	7	"North to the Future"	Sunu Gonera	Kristi Korzec	November 19, 2017	5.86
A Russian eco-activist sneaks onto a diplomatic plane to the US, but when he arrives, it is discovered that he has smallpox. Elizabeth initially suspects the Russian government, but is convinced by former United Nations employee Kat Sandoval that the cause is most likely the thawing permafrost in Siberia. The US, Canada, Greenland, China, and Russia agree to a program of efforts to prevent permafrost thaw. One of Henry's team tells him that there is an investigation into multiple agents across different agencies being revealed, just like Nasifa. Henry suspects that the leaker must be someone in the president's cabinet. Elizabeth hires Kat as policy advisor. Worried by Jason's obsession with his girlfriend, Henry and Elizabeth attempt to caution him about sex.
76	8	"The Fourth Estate"	Sam Hoffman	Matt Chester	November 26, 2017	5.82
Upset that his son is back in rehab, Conrad demands that Mexico extradite a major drug cartel leader, despite Russell and Elizabeth urging him to take a different approach. During the extradition, the cartel leader is released and 21 federales are killed. With information gathered by a journalist who has been murdered, Elizabeth's team confirms that Mexico's foreign minister is working with the cartel leader. The US provides intelligence to Mexico that results in the foreign minister's arrest and the recapture of the cartel leader. Henry's team identifies the senator who is giving classified information to Russia. Blake's parents visit and pressure him to take a private sector job. Elizabeth tells Blake that she believes he has potential for greater things, so she plans to fire him in a year, giving him that time to decide what he wants to aim for. Dmitri and Stevie start dating.
77	9	"Minefield"	Rob Greenlea	Matt Ward	December 10, 2017	6.45
Elizabeth reluctantly hosts a Christmas party to gratify party donors and also hopes to sway a few Senate votes for a landmine treaty she is pushing to ratify. The CIA and the FBI coordinate to investigate Senator Carpenter. Elizabeth and Morejon team up to keep Carpenter at her party while his residence is being searched. Conrad signs the ratified treaty. After Carpenter is brought in for questioning, Henry accuses him of selling American lives to keep his son out of prison for financial misconduct, and Carpenter falls apart.
78	10	"Women Transform the World"	Eric Stoltz	Lyla Oliver	December 17, 2017	5.53
Henry and Dmitri travel to Afghanistan to recruit an old friend of Dmitri's as an asset, and he tells them of a plan to circumvent an upcoming military operation against the Taliban. He is later tortured and killed, leading Dmitri to worry that his friend may have been forced to reveal that Dmitri is still alive. Conrad must decide between proceeding with the military operation or agreeing to a diplomatic compromise that will give the Taliban a voice in Afghanistan's government, and he chooses the diplomatic route. Afghanistan's minister of education, who is in the US to speak at a women's conference, is dismayed, because the compromise includes a prohibition against women in the government. Daisy takes her daughter to meet her paternal grandmother.
79	11	"Mitya"	Geoffrey Arend	Alexander Maggio	January 7, 2018	6.11
In retaliation for the US peace agreement in Afghanistan, Russia bans all adoptions of Russian children by American parents. Vice President Theresa Hurst gives assurances to the media that the government will do everything possible to return the children, which has the result of locking the US into negotiations. Theresa and Elizabeth travel to Russia to discuss the issue, but are unable to reach an acceptable agreement with Russia. A Russian assassin targets Dmitri. The US captures the assassin and bribes him into revealing the name of his handler. Elizabeth uses that intelligence to pressure the Russian president into accepting the terms originally offered. The children are returned to their adoptive families. Dmitri and Stevie say goodbye before he leaves for his new assignment in Alaska.
80	12	"Sound and Fury"	Debbie Reinsich	Barbara Hall & David Grae	January 14, 2018	7.25
It becomes clear to multiple presidential advisors that Conrad is behaving erratically and out of character. After Conrad insists on destroying five Russian satellites with missiles against the unanimous advice of the National Security Council, Russell and Elizabeth secretly convene the cabinet and vice president. The decision is made to invoke Section 4 of the twenty-fifth amendment. Russell, Elizabeth, and the president's wife confront Conrad with the decision. They offer to let him declare an inability to fulfill his office under Section 3 instead, if he will agree to a medical exam. The medical exam identifies a meningioma intruding on his frontal lobe as the cause of the changes in his behavior. Theresa Hurst steps in as acting president while Conrad is treated.
81	13	"Reading the Signs"	Phil Bertelsen	Moira Kirland	March 11, 2018	6.28
Alison decides to move back home and commute to school after her roommate's suicide attempt. Henry, frustrated by the lack of support from the Gang of Eight, quits his CIA position. After Elizabeth jumps through hoops to rescue a trade agreement with Sri Lanka to prevent that country from making a deal with China, Theresa decides that she will not sign the agreement.
82	14	"Refuge"	Eric Stoltz	Kristi Korzec	March 18, 2018	5.72
When the government of Abkhazia begins persecuting the LGBTQ community, Jay and Kat put together a plan to smuggle out a small group with the assistance of Kurds in Turkey. Working with the Kurds puts the US relationship with Turkey in jeopardy, and Elizabeth is forced to make undesirable concessions to rescue the refugees. She warns Jay and Kat to learn from this mistake. Jason gets a perfect score on the PSAT and worries it will cause his parents to have unrealistic expectations of him.
83	15	"The Unnamed"	Felix Alcala	Joy Gregory	March 25, 2018	6.14
The new president of Myanmar is in D.C. to receive an award when Elizabeth's team learns of violence against the Rohingya people in his country. Medical personnel have determined that Conrad is fit to take office again, but he is hesitant. Unable to convince the president of Myanmar to renounce the violence, Elizabeth asks Conrad to step in. Conrad talks to the president of Myanmar, then signs the letter that begins the process of returning to the presidency.
84	16	"My Funny Valentine"	Rob Greenlea	Matt Ward	April 1, 2018	5.75
The CIA wants American sanctions on Sudan lifted so they can establish a base there; the State Department objects because Sudan's earlier support of terrorism led to the bombing of the US Embassy in Uganda. While examining Sudan's finances to verify that they are no longer supporting terrorism, evidence is found that the al Queda operative behind the Ugandan bombing is still alive and in Sudan. Elizabeth gives the Sudan foreign minister information intended to push the operative to escape to his villa, where CIA agents are waiting to take him into custody. The State Department holds a ceremony, commemorating the loss of lives twenty years earlier in Uganda. At Matt's urging, Daisy adopts Waffles, a beagle who failed bomb-detection training. Jason leads Henry to think that he is breaking up with Piper, but Jason and Piper work things out.
85	17	"Phase Two"	Martha Mitchell	Leland Jay Anderson	April 8, 2018	6.19
An American is one of the victims of a bomb explosion in a restaurant in Saudi Arabia. Morejon uses the incident to accuse Elizabeth of fomenting terrorist actions through the nuclear peace deal that she made with Iran. He gathers votes on legislation that would not only prevent phase 2 of the talks with Iran but would undo the progress that she made in phase 1. The family of the killed American file a lawsuit against Elizabeth personally for the wrongful death of their son. Conrad tells Elizabeth to halt the talks with Iran until after the midterm elections. Elizabeth explains to the family that their son was a CIA operative who was killed in service to his country. She also learns that a Saudi Arabian government official is paying for the lawsuit, and that Morejon is aware that Saudi Arabia is trying to influence the US talks with Iran. The family drops the lawsuit and the talks with Iran resume. Henry takes a position as head of a new department of military ethics. Jason wins a National Merit scholarship.
86	18	"The Friendship Game"	Sam Hoffman	Lyla Oliver	April 22, 2018	6.06
Elizabeth is concerned that President Tejeda, who is facing an anti-American opponent in a tight election in Honduras, may withdraw from a pending agreement to help combat gang and cartel violence in Central and South American countries. Tejeda requests that Honduras receive aid funds as soon as the agreement is signed, which Elizabeth rejects. A group of NGO workers in Honduras, including an American, are taken captive and $30 million ransom is demanded. Although a wealthy American is willing to pay the ransom, the group holding the hostages does not provide a means of accepting the money, which raises suspicions. Intelligence gathering finally determines that the workers were taken hostage by Tejeda's own security force. Elizabeth gives a press conference in which she reveals that Tejeda was behind both the kidnapping and release of the captives. Elizabeth and Henry try to make new friends. Matt decides to attempt a long-distance relationship.
87	19	"Thin Ice"	Felix Alcala	Moira Kirkland & Alexander Maggio	April 29, 2018	6.03
Elizabeth attends an Arctic Council conference, and takes Jason and Piper along so that Piper can get an interview with a well-known activist who is protesting there. During the conference, a bomb explodes. Security whisks Elizabeth to safety. They discover Jason and Piper in Piper's hotel room. Intelligence determines that the Russians instigated the bombing, and are moving their ships into US territory in the Arctic during the confusion. China will assist the US in the Arctic by providing icebreakers if China is given a seat on the Arctic Council. The combined force convinces Russia to back down. Henry counsels a student who wants to declare himself a conscientious objector. Piper breaks up with Jason.
88	20	"The Things We Get to Say"	Sunu Gonera	Joy Gregory	May 6, 2018	5.91
A journalist is selected to shadow Elizabeth for 48 hours. Children in Honduras are fleeing the country due to gang violence, but Elizabeth is unable to offer asylum while Congress is considering Dalton's new immigration policy. Senator Morejon speaks out against the policy because it will reduce prison privatization. Elizabeth approaches a private prison contractor, one of Morejon's major donors, and suggests that he convert his excess prison space to take in the Honduran refugees.
89	21	"Protocol"	Charlotte Brandstrom	Matt Ward	May 13, 2018	5.90
A terrorist group takes over a dam on the Tigris River in Iraq and threatens to blow it up if Iraq doesn't release thousands of its members from prison. Conrad suggests that Turkey shut off the flow of water on the Tigris upstream, but Turkey's president makes impossible demands in return. When dissident members in Turkey attempt a coup and the president is in hiding, Elizabeth pleads with Turkey's foreign minister to convince the rebels to shut down the dam. The resulting lower water level reveals a previously unknown entrance to the Iraq dam, which Iraq security forces and US Seal members use to take back the dam. The president of Turkey puts down the coup and orders the foreign minister back to Turkey. Fearing that he will be executed if he returns, Elizabeth arranges a mock arrest of him and his family at the airport and offers him political asylum. Russell takes up his childhood hobby of model planes in an attempt to learn how to relax.
90	22	"Night Watch"	Rob Greenlea	Barbara Hall & David Grae	May 20, 2018	6.22
Thousands of nuclear missiles launched from Russia and aimed for the US are detected. Conrad is convinced to order a counterattack, but his initial order is delayed when the receiving officer is removed from duty. His second attempt to launch American missiles goes through. At the last moment, a general who had loaded a simulation on the backup server that had inadvertently been triggered is able to abort the launches. Shaken and horrified by the near miss, Elizabeth argues that they need to revisit their nuclear deterrence policies. She is able to convince Russia to agree to discuss de-alerting missiles. To gain public support for the revised treaty, Conrad gives a public address revealing the recent incident. Elizabeth tells Henry that she does not want to see this progress undone and intends to run for president.

== Production ==
=== Development ===
Madam Secretary was renewed for a fourth season on March 23, 2017.

=== Casting ===
Bebe Neuwirth left the cast after the third episode of the season. Sara Ramirez joined the cast as Kat Sandoval as a series regular. Hall said of Ramirez: "She brings a fresh perspective and a fun, energetic quality to the State Department staff."

== Broadcast ==
Season four of Madam Secretary premiered on October 8, 2017.

== Ratings ==
Viewership and ratings per episode of Madam Secretary season 4
No.	Title	Air date	Rating/share (18–49)	Viewers (millions)	DVR (18–49)	DVR viewers (millions)	Total (18–49)	Total viewers (millions)
1	"News Cycle"	October 8, 2017	0.7/3	7.21	—N/a	3.28	—N/a	10.49
2	"Off the Record"	October 15, 2017	0.7/3	6.36	0.5	3.16	1.2	9.52
3	"The Essentials"	October 22, 2017	0.8/3	6.43	—N/a	3.07	—N/a	9.50
4	"Shutdown"	October 29, 2017	0.6/2	5.83	—N/a	2.87	—N/a	8.71
5	"Persona Non Grata"	November 5, 2017	0.6/2	5.92	—N/a	3.13	—N/a	9.06
6	"Loophole"	November 12, 2017	0.6/2	6.63	—N/a	2.92	—N/a	9.55
7	"North to the Future"	November 19, 2017	0.6/2	5.86	—N/a	2.93	—N/a	8.80
8	"The Fourth Estate"	November 26, 2017	0.6/2	5.82	—N/a	—N/a	—N/a	—N/a
9	"Minefield"	December 10, 2017	0.7/3	6.45	—N/a	3.07	—N/a	9.53
10	"Women Transform the World"	December 17, 2017	0.7/3	5.53	—N/a	—N/a	—N/a	—N/a
11	"Mitya"	January 7, 2018	0.6/2	6.11	—N/a	—N/a	—N/a	—N/a
12	"Sound and Fury"	January 14, 2018	0.7/3	7.25	0.5	3.15	1.2	10.40
13	"Reading the Signs"	March 11, 2018	0.6/2	6.28	—N/a	2.93	—N/a	9.22
14	"Refuge"	March 18, 2018	0.6/3	5.72	—N/a	2.62	—N/a	8.34
15	"The Unnamed"	March 25, 2018	0.7/3	6.14	—N/a	2.70	—N/a	8.84
16	"My Funny Valentine"	April 1, 2018	0.5/2	5.75	0.4	2.88	0.9	8.63
17	"Phase Two"	April 8, 2018	0.6/2	6.19	—N/a	2.68	—N/a	8.87
18	"The Friendship Game"	April 22, 2018	0.6/3	6.06	—N/a	2.77	—N/a	8.83
19	"Thin Ice"	April 29, 2018	0.6/3	6.03	—N/a	2.67	—N/a	8.71
20	"The Things We Get to Say"	May 6, 2018	0.5/2	5.91	—N/a	2.55	—N/a	8.46
21	"Protocol"	May 13, 2018	0.6/3	5.90	—N/a	2.82	—N/a	8.72
22	"Night Watch"	May 20, 2018	0.6/3	6.22	0.3	2.51	0.9	8.73
