= A Man in Full (miniseries) =

American limited series

- Genre: Drama
- Created by: David E. Kelley
- Based on: A Man in Full by Tom Wolfe
- Directed by: Regina King; Thomas Schlamme
- Starring: Jeff Daniels; Diane Lane; Tom Pelphrey; Aml Ameen; Chanté Adams; Jon Michael Hill; Sarah Jones; William Jackson Harper; Lucy Liu
- Music by: Craig DeLeon
- Country of origin: United States
- Original language: English
- No. of episodes: 6

Production
- Executive producers: David E. Kelley; Regina King; Thomas Schlamme; Reina King; Matthew Tinker; Thomas R. Wolfe; Alexandra Wolfe
- Producers: Ted Gidlow; Shana C. Waterman
- Production location: Atlanta, Georgia
- Cinematography: Tobie Marier-Robitaille; Craig Wrobleski
- Editors: Naomi Sunrise Filoramo; Julia Grove; Ben Lester
- Running time: 38–48 minutes
- Production companies: David E. Kelley Productions; Royal Ties Productions

Original release
- Network: Netflix
- Release: May 2, 2024

A Man in Full is an American drama miniseries starring Jeff Daniels and Diane Lane, created and written by David E. Kelley, and directed by Regina King and Thomas Schlamme. The series consists of six episodes, and premiered on Netflix on May 2, 2024. It is based on the 1998 novel of the same name by Tom Wolfe.

== Premise ==
Business and political interests collide when Atlanta real estate mogul Charlie Croker defends his empire from those wanting to capitalize on his sudden bankruptcy and fall from grace.

== Cast and characters ==
=== Main ===
- Jeff Daniels as Charlie Croker
- Diane Lane as Martha Croker
- Tom Pelphrey as Raymond Peepgrass
- Aml Ameen as Roger White
- Chanté Adams as Jill Hensley
- Jon Michael Hill as Conrad Hensley
- Sarah Jones as Serena Croker
- William Jackson Harper as Wes Jordan
- Lucy Liu as Joyce Newman

=== Recurring ===
- Bill Camp as Harry Zale
- Jerrika Hinton as Henrietta White
- Eline Powell as Sirja Tiramaki
- Christian Clemenson as Wismer Stroock
- Evan Roe as Wally Croker
- Josh Pais as Herb Richman
- Anthony Heald as Judge Taylor
- L. Warren Young as Gerald
- Neal Reddy as D.A Jennings
- Atkins Estimond as Five-O

== Episodes ==
No.	Title	Directed by	Written by	Original release date
1	"Saddlebags"	Regina King	David E. Kelley	May 2, 2024
2	"The Big Squash"	Thomas Schlamme	David E. Kelley	May 2, 2024
3	"The Takedown"	Thomas Schlamme	David E. Kelley	May 2, 2024
4	"Tick Tick"	Thomas Schlamme	David E. Kelley	May 2, 2024
5	"Push Comes to Shove"	Regina King	David E. Kelley	May 2, 2024
6	"Judgment Day"	Regina King	David E. Kelley	May 2, 2024

== Production ==
=== Development ===
On November 4, 2021, it was announced that Netflix had given a series order to A Man in Full, which is based on the novel of the same name by Tom Wolfe. The series is created by David E. Kelley and half of its episodes directed by Regina King. The two also executive produce along with Matthew Tinker. The series is produced by Royal Ties Productions and David E. Kelley Productions.

=== Casting ===
In early May 2022, Jeff Daniels was cast. Diane Lane was cast as the female lead in July 2022. William Jackson Harper, Aml Ameen, Tom Pelphrey, Sarah Jones, Jon Michael Hill, Chanté Adams, Lucy Liu, and Bill Camp joined the series in August 2022.

=== Filming ===
Filming was previously set to begin in May 2022. Filming began on August 8, 2022, in Atlanta, Georgia, and wrapped on December 10.

== Release ==
A Man in Full was released on May 2, 2024.

== Reception ==
The series divided critics with many praising its direction, writing, and its ensemble, in particular Jeff Daniels leading performance, but criticizing its exploration into the themes of the Tom Wolfe 1998 novel of the same name. Review aggregator website Rotten Tomatoes reported a 50% approval rating with an average rating of 5.5/10, based on 40 critic reviews. The website's critics consensus reads, "For a show with excellent pedigree and a Tom Wolfe novel to draw from, A Man in Full is disappointingly half-baked in its exploration of masculinity." Metacritic assigned a score of 50 out of 100 based on 20 critics, indicating "mixed or average reviews".

The central performance by Jeff Daniels was praised by critics with Richard Roeper of The Chicago Sun-Times declaring him as being "perfectly cast" and having "turned in a world-class performance as the powerful and obscenely wealthy but beleaguered real estate tycoon". David Bianculli of NPR agreed calling his performance "charismatic" and having "created a formidable man who's used to throwing his weight around." Nick Schager of The Daily Beast wrote that the show "struts about with swaggering ferocity, led by Jeff Daniels’ full-bodied performance as a blustery, bloviating capitalist predator." He also added, "Daniels chews scenery with larger-than-life gusto, lending the action the titanic attitude it demands".

Andrews Anthony of The Observer praised the series' writing, "The dialogue bristles and the acting is top-notch" describing it as "essential viewing." John DeVore of The A.V. Club gave the series a mixed review writing, "A Man In Full feels half-baked. All the elements are there. It’s well-shot, acted, and directed. No expense was spared. But it lacks punch." Alison Herman of Variety wrote negatively of the series writing, "The show ends up far less than the sum of its parts, an oddly generic and muted take on a larger-than-life American story."
