= Elizabeth McCord (Madam Secretary) =

- Madam Secretary character
- Téa Leoni as Elizabeth McCord
- First appearance: "Pilot"
- Last appearance: "Leaving the Station"
- Created by: Barbara Hall
- Portrayed by: Téa Leoni (2014–19)

In-universe information
- Full name: Elizabeth Adams McCord
- Nicknames: Bess, Lizzie
- Gender: Female
- Titles: President of the United States; Former: United States Secretary of State
- Occupation: Politician; Diplomat (former); Professor (former); CIA Analyst (former)
- Affiliation: United States Department of State
- Family: Benjamin Adams (father); Suzanne Adams (mother); Dr. Will Adams (brother)
- Spouses: Henry McCord
- Children: Stephanie "Stevie" McCord; Allison McCord; Jason McCord
- Relatives: Dimitri Petrov (son-in-law); Sophie Adams (sister-in-law); Annie Adams (niece); Patrick McCord (father-in-law); Mrs. McCord (mother-in-law); Erin McCord (sister-in-law); Shane McCord (brother-in-law); Sarah McCord (niece); Maureen McCord-Ryan (sister-in-law); Tom Ryan (brother-in-law); John Ryan (nephew); Kenzie Ryan (niece); Kelly Ryan (niece)
- Nationality: American

Elizabeth "Bess" Adams McCord is a fictional character and the protagonist of the CBS political drama series Madam Secretary. She is portrayed by Téa Leoni. McCord serves as the United States Secretary of State over the course of the series; the sixth and final season covers her first year after being elected as the first female president of the United States.

== Biography ==
Born in Virginia, Elizabeth Adams and her brother Will (Eric Stoltz) were orphaned when both their parents died in a car accident, inspiring Will became a physician.

Elizabeth attended the private Houghton Hall Boarding School. She was co-captain of the debate team, alongside Bahrainian Crown Prince Yousif Obaid (Aasif Mandvi). She attended the University of Virginia, studying mathematics. One of her professors was future Chief Justice of the United States Frawley (Morgan Freeman). It was also where she met her future husband Henry McCord. Immediately prior to her appointment as Secretary of State, Elizabeth held a professorship at the University of Virginia and is depicted as holding a doctorate.

In 1990, Elizabeth married Henry McCord (Tim Daly). They have three children- Stephanie "Stevie" (Wallis Currie-Wood), Alison (Kathrine Herzer) and Jason (Evan Roe).

Elizabeth speaks fluent French, German, Arabic, Persian, and "a year of high school Spanish".

== Career ==
Elizabeth worked as a CIA analyst for 20 years; she resigned from her position over an ethical dilemma after serving as Station Chief in Baghdad. She was hired at the University of Virginia as a political science professor.

After the death of Secretary of State Vincent Marsh (Brian Stokes Mitchell) in a suspicious plane crash, President Conrad Dalton (Keith Carradine), personally asked Elizabeth - his former mentee at the CIA- to serve in his cabinet as secretary of state. Not a natural politician, Elizabeth frequently clashed with White House Chief of Staff Russell Jackson (Željko Ivanek). As secretary of state, much of her first year in office was spent investigating her predecessor's death.

In "Tamerlane", Elizabeth is in the home of Iranian Foreign Minister Zahed Javani (Usman Ally) when a coup d'état orchestrated by the late Secretary of State Marsh, CIA Director Andrew Munsey, and CIA analyst Juliet Humphrey is attempted. During the attack, both Minister Javani and Elizabeth's personal bodyguard, DSS Agent Fred Cole, are killed. In the aftermath, Elizabeth suffers PTSD. She starts to see a therapist also used by Russell Jackson.

In "The Show Must Go On", during a communications blackout aboard Air Force One with both the president and the Speaker of the House on board, and with the vice president in surgery and president pro tempore of the Senate found to be incompetent after a series of mini-strokes, Elizabeth is sworn in as acting president for several hours.

In "You Say You Want a Revolution", Elizabeth and her Cuban counterpart are instrumental in the restoration of Cuba–United States relations. This includes the opening of the Cuban embassy in Washington and the U.S. embassy in Havana, and the repeal of the longstanding embargo against Cuba. These actions are considered a significant achievement for the Dalton administration.

In "Vartius", due to the failing health and impending resignation of Vice President Mark Delgado (Alex Fernandez), President Dalton offers the vice presidency to McCord. She initially accepts, but when President Dalton loses his party's primary election, she advises him to run instead as an independent candidate. She suggests that he ask popular Pennsylvania Senator Teresa Hurst to be his running mate, as winning Pennsylvania would increase his chances of ensuring neither major party's candidate would achieve a majority in the Electoral College. On election night, Dalton wins several key states, including Pennsylvania, guaranteeing that neither major party candidate secures a majority. Thanks to the efforts of Russell Jackson, Dalton is re-elected by the House of Representatives in a contingent election.

In Season 4, McCord is considered a favorite to run for president, even over Vice President Hurst. Russell Jackson tells her that President Dalton would rather leave the presidency to her than to Hurst, who has her own ambitions.

In Season 5, McCord offers her resignation to President Dalton, which he accepts. In "Better Angels", Elizabeth holds a public gathering at her family farm, during which she officially announces her candidacy for the presidency of the United States.

In "Hail to the Chief"- the first episode of Season 6- it is revealed that McCord won and became the nation's first female president. Flashbacks in the episode show a variety of key moments in McCord's campaign: her opponents were Republican Senator Beauregard Miller (Guy Boyd), a populist fearmonger who picked up the nationalistic rhetoric started by disgraced Kentucky Senator Owen Callister (Will Chase). In the initial stretch of the campaign, McCord remained firmly in third position. Against the advice of her campaign manager Mike B, McCord decides to underscore her message of unity and opposition to entrenched partisanship by offering the vice presidency to her old rival, Senator Carlos Morejon (José Zúñiga). Although Morejon is reluctant to abandon the Republican Party, McCord promises to give him a chance to argue his own opinion on every policy she enacts. At the end of the episode, McCord and Morejon appear together in a flashback at their first joint campaign rally.

Season 6 also opens with accusations that the McCord campaign conspired with Iran to win the election. The second episode, "The Strike Zone", features former campaign manager, and chief of chief, Mike B. (now serving as Counselor to the President) testifying at a hearing of the Senate Intelligence Committee. The following episodes portray two of McCord's staffers, Blake Moran and Daisy Grant, also testifying to this committee. Her husband Henry and daughter Stephanie McCord are also eventually forced to testify. In the series' penultimate episode, President McCord testifies, against the counsel of multiple advisors. After her testimony, the committee votes against impeachment proceedings.

=== Staff ===
When she takes office as Secretary of State, Elizabeth inherited all of her senior staff from her late predecessor, with the exception of her personal assistant Blake Moran (Erich Bergen) and her new policy advisor Kat Sandoval (Sara Ramirez).

Her senior staff at the State Department consists of:

- Nadine Tolliver (Bebe Neuwirth) – Chief of Staff to the Secretary (Ret. 2017)
- Jay Whitman (Sebastian Arcelus) – Policy Advisor, Chief of Staff (2017–2019), White House Chief of Staff (2022–present)
- Daisy Grant (Patina Miller) – Spokesperson for the US Department of State, White House Press Secretary (2021–Present)
- Matt Mahoney (Geoffrey Arend) – Head of Speechwriting
- Blake Moran (Erich Bergen) – Executive assistant; Associate Policy Advisor (2017–2019), Executive Assistant to the President (2021–present)
- Kat Sandoval (Sara Ramirez) – Policy advisor (2017–2019)

In "Blame Canada", Elizabeth fires Allen Bollings (John Finn), the chief negotiator responsible for peace talks with Iran. He had threatened military action rather than the trade ban relaxations she authorized, and then lied about his actions.

In "Whisper of the Ax", Elizabeth recruits veteran political operative Michael "Mike B." Barnow (Kevin Rahm) as a special advisor to help her strategize; Mike B. is referred to as her "personal hatchet man".

In "The Essentials", Nadine Tolliver retires from the State Department in order to spend more time with her family in San Francisco. Following her departure, Elizabeth names Jay as her new Chief of Staff.

== Influences ==
The character of Elizabeth McCord is partially inspired by both Madeleine Albright and Hillary Clinton. Each of these politicians also made cameo guest appearances in the show. McCord has been the subject of analysis in the context of media representation of female political figures.

== See also ==
- List of Madam Secretary characters
