= Evan Roe =

American actor (born 2000)

- Born: Evan Christopher Roe; February 9, 2000 (age 26); Seattle, Washington, U.S.
- Education: New York University
- Occupation: Actor
- Years active: 2012–present

Evan Christopher Roe (born February 9, 2000) is an American actor. He is best known for his roles in the CBS political drama series Madam Secretary (2014-2019) and the Netflix miniseries A Man in Full (2024).

== Early life and education ==
Roe was born in Seattle, Washington, and raised in San Diego, California and New York City. He briefly attended the Professional Performing Arts School and graduated from New York University in 2022.

== Career ==
Roe began his career as a child actor, appearing in episodes of Disney Channel's Jessie and Nickelodeon's Sam & Cat. From 2014 to 2019 he portrayed Jason McCord, the son of Secretary of State Elizabeth McCord, on Madam Secretary. The following year he appeared in director Tayarisha Poe's debut film Selah and the Spades, which premiered at the 2019 Sundance Film Festival and was released in 2020. In 2024, Roe appeared opposite Jeff Daniels and Diane Lane in the Netflix miniseries A Man in Full.

== Filmography ==
=== Film ===
Year	Title	Role	Notes
2016	Time Toys	Bryce	
2019	Selah and the Spades	Two Tom	

=== Television ===
Year	Title	Role	Notes
2012	Jessie	Billy	Episode: "Make New Friends, But Hide the Old"
2014	Sam & Cat	Trey	Episode: "#BlooperEpisode"
2014	Saint George	Archie	Episode: "I Wish"
2014–2019	Madam Secretary	Jason McCord	Main role; 114 episodes
2024	A Man in Full	Wally Croker	Miniseries
