= Wallis Currie-Wood =

American actress (born 1991)

- Born: December 12, 1991 (age 34); Austin, Texas, U.S.
- Education: Juilliard School (BFA)
- Occupation: Actress
- Years active: 2014–present

Wallis Currie-Wood (born December 12, 1991) is an American actress. She is best known for her role as Stephanie "Stevie" McCord on the CBS political drama series Madam Secretary.

== Early years ==
Currie-Wood was born December 12, 1991, in Austin, Texas. She studied violin at the University of Texas String Project and the Austin Chamber Music Academy.

Currie-Wood attended the Juilliard School, where she performed in productions such as Twelfth Night, The Cherry Orchard, and Buried Child.

== Career ==
After graduating from Juilliard, Currie-Wood first appeared in Nancy Meyers' 2015 comedy The Intern. She played Stephanie "Stevie" McCord, the eldest daughter of Secretary of State Elizabeth McCord, on Madam Secretary. The six-season series aired from 2014 to 2019. Currie-Wood appeared in the West End production of Elektra at the Duke of York's Theatre in London. The production, which ran from January 24, 2025 through April 12, 2025, featured Currie-Wood as a member of the Greek Chorus and the understudy.
