= Erich Bergen =

American actor

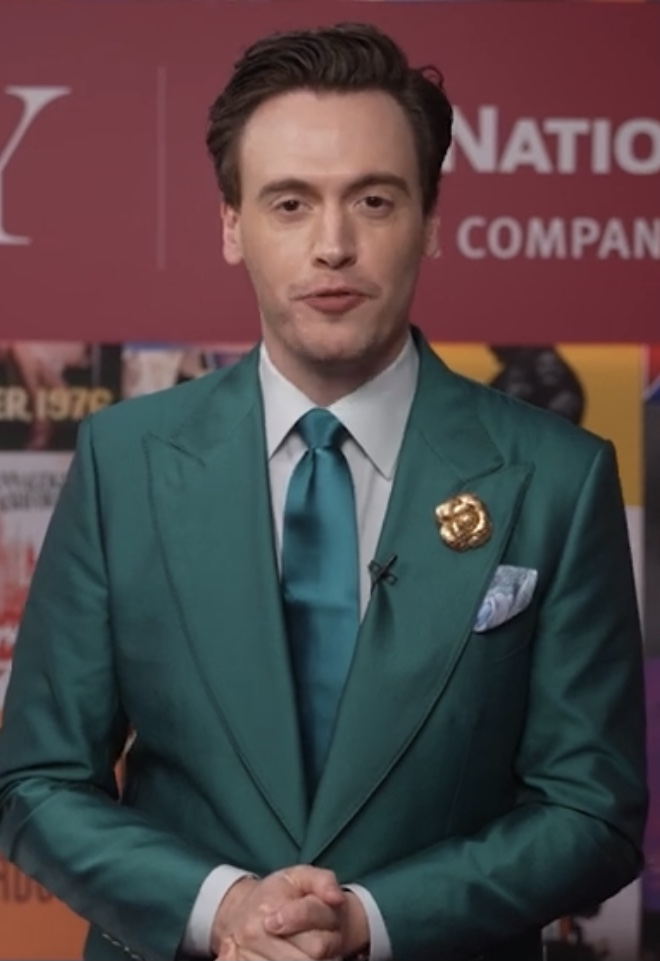
- Erich Bergen in 2023
- Born: December 31, 1985 (age 40); New York City, U.S.
- Education: University of North Carolina School of the Arts (BFA)
- Occupations: Actor; singer; presenter
- Years active: 2007–present

Erich Bergen (born December 31, 1985) is an American actor. He is best known for his roles as Bob Gaudio in the biographical musical drama film Jersey Boys and as Blake Moran in the CBS television series Madam Secretary.

== Biography ==
Bergen attended the Stagedoor Manor Performing Arts Center in Loch Sheldrake, New York, for seven years before studying at the University of North Carolina School of the Arts. His television credits include Gossip Girl, Desperate Housewives, Person of Interest and Franklin & Bash. From 2014 through 2019, Bergen appeared on the CBS television series Madam Secretary as Blake Moran, personal Secretary to Secretary of State Elizabeth McCord (played by Téa Leoni).

In 2013, Bergen was diagnosed with testicular cancer and underwent chemotherapy.

He played Bob Gaudio in the 2008 Las Vegas production of Jersey Boys. In 2012, he played Billy in the US national tour of Anything Goes. Bergen reprised his role as Gaudio in the 2014 Jersey Boys film. He made his Broadway debut in June 2018, as Dr. Jim Pomatter in Waitress. After leaving the cast in August 2018, Bergen returned to the Broadway production as Dr. Pomatter from June 4 through July 21, 2019. He then returned after the COVID-19 pandemic in 2021 for a limited time. He also played Billy Flynn in Chicago in 2022 and 2023.

== Filmography ==
=== TV and film ===
Key
†	Denotes films that have not yet been released

Year	Title	Role	Notes
1996	The Dana Carvey Show	Son	Episode: "The Taco Bell Dana Carvey Show"; uncredited
2009–2010	Gossip Girl	Paul Hoffman	2 episodes
2012	Joey Dakota	Paul	TV film
2012	Person of Interest	Bradley Petrosian	Episode: "Baby Blue"
2012	Franklin & Bash	Keith Flynn	Episode: "Last Dance"
2012	Childrens Hospital	Male Nurse / Dancer	Episode: "Chief's Origin"
2013	How Sweet It Is	Ethan Trimble	
2014	Jersey Boys	Bob Gaudio	Film
2014–2019	Madam Secretary	Blake Moran	Main Role
2017	Humor Me	Randy	Film
2019	Tell Me a Story	NYPD Officer 1	Episode: "Chapter 10: Forgiveness"
2020	City on a Hill	Boston PD Officer 1	Episode: "Bill Russell's Bedsheets"
2021	Bull	ADA Robert Jones	Season 6, recurring
2022	The Good Fight	Steven Sheen	Episode: "The End of Eli Gold"
2026	Love Story	Anthony Radziwill	Main role
2026	Elsbeth	Otis Langley	Episode: "Catch and Kill"
2026	Cupertino	Carl Kenner	Episode: "Harper"
TBA	Both Sides Now †	Lloyd	Filming

=== Theatre ===
Year	Title	Role	Notes
2008	Jersey Boys	Bob Gaudio	Paris Las Vegas
2010	A Funny Thing Happened on the Way to the Forum	Hero	Freud Playhouse
2011	A Snow White Christmas	Prince Harry	El Portal Theatre
2012–2013	Anything Goes	Billy Crocker	US Tour
2018	Waitress	Dr. Jim Pomatter	Broadway
2019	Waitress	Dr. Jim Pomatter	Broadway
2021	Waitress	Dr. Jim Pomatter	Broadway
2022	Chicago	Billy Flynn	Broadway
2023	Chicago	Billy Flynn	Broadway
2025	Boop! The Musical	Raymond Demarest	Broadway
