= Chris Petrovski =

Macedonian-born American actor

Chris Petrovski is an American actor born in Bitola, North Macedonia, known for his role as Dmitri Petrov on the television series Madam Secretary.

== Life and career ==
Petrovski's parents brought him to New Zealand while he was still a baby. While still in high school in New Zealand, Petrovski obtained an agent and was hired as an extra in a production of Spartacus: War of the Damned. For a time, he attended high school at New Zealand's One Tree Hill College, where he performed a role in the school's production of Hamlet. Petrovski graduated from the Unitec Institute of Technology's acting program in New Zealand. He then obtained a scholarship and moved to Los Angeles, California, to attend Stella Adler Acting Academy, from which he graduated. In 2013, he portrayed George Shank in the film All Cheerleaders Die. In 2014, he starred in the film Coldwater. In 2017, he performed alongside Alexandra Chelaru in the Menzingers' "After the Party" music video, directed by Kyle Thrash.

On Madam Secretary, Petrovski portrayed Dmitri Petrov (seasons 2 & 4; guest season 3, guest season 5), a 24-year-old Russian Army captain who studied at the National War College.

== Filmography ==
=== Film ===
Chris Petrovski film roles
Year	Title	Role	Notes	Ref.
2012	Finding Dad	Chris		
2012	Live to Tell	Brandon	Short film	
2012	Pushing Eternity	John	Short film	
2013	All Cheerleaders Must Die	George Shank		
2013	Coldwater	Gabriel Nunez		
2013	An Easter Bunny Puppy	Jasper		
2013	Loss of Life	Ricky		
2014	Soledad	Jordan		
2015	H8RZ	Ricky		
2016	Barrio	Carlos		
2016	In the Moment	Corey / Cory		
2016	Tourbillon	Markus		
2017	The Body Tree	Brandon		
2017	Sable	Colton		
2018	National Justice			
2018	Breaking Brooklyn	Corey		
2019	Catching Up	Zeke Tomlinson		
2019	Paradise City	Alistair		
2019	The Shed	Marble		
2020	The Drummer	Manny		
2020	How to Say I Love You At Night	Paul		
2021	Bolivar	Jake		
2022	Listen	Ziv		
2022	Ray Donovan: The Movie	Young Sean Walker		
2024	Chief of Station	Nick Malloy		
TBA	The Boy in the Iron Box		Post-production	

=== Television ===
Chris Petrovski television roles
Year	Title	Role	Notes	Ref.
2010	Spartacus: War of the Damned	Slave		
2015–2019	Madam Secretary	Dmitri Petrov	Recurring (seasons 2, 4, 6); guest (season 3)	
2019	The Blacklist	RAT	Episode: "The Cryptobanker (No. 160)	
2023	Average Joe	Dmitri Dzhugashvili		
2023	FBI	Valon Sula	Episode: "Torn"	
2023–2024	NCIS	Lev Trotski	2 episodes	
2023	The Rookie: Feds	Vorovin	Episode: "Seeing Red"	
