= Barbara Hall (TV producer) =

American television producer, singer, and m writer

- Born: July 17, 1960 (age 66); Chatham, Virginia, U.S.
- Education: James Madison University (BA)
- Occupations: TV writer; TV producer; novelist; singer-songwriter
- Spouse: Paul Karon (m. 1998)
- Relatives: Karen Hall (sister)

Barbara Hall (born July 17, 1960) is an American television writer, producer, young adult novelist and singer-songwriter. She is known for creating and producing the legal drama Judging Amy (1999–2005) and the fantasy family drama Joan of Arcadia (2003–2005) as well as the political drama Madam Secretary all for CBS. She was a co-executive producer of the Showtime political thriller Homeland.

== Biography ==
Hall was born in Chatham, Virginia, to Ervis and Flo Hall. Her older sister, Karen Hall, is also a television writer and producer. She graduated from Chatham High School in 1978, and summa cum laude from James Madison University with a Bachelor of Arts degree in English in 1982.

Shortly after graduating from university, Hall became a television writer and producer in Los Angeles, California, and worked on shows including Northern Exposure, Chicago Hope, ER, I'll Fly Away, Anything But Love and Moonlighting. Then she created, wrote and produced the CBS legal drama Judging Amy (1999–2005) and the CBS fantasy family drama Joan of Arcadia (2003–2005). In 2013, she created, wrote and produced the CBS political drama Madam Secretary, which ran from September 21, 2014, to December 8, 2019.

Hall is also a founding member of the alternative country rock band The Enablers, with whom she released the albums The First Seven Songs (2003) and Come Back Soon (2004). In 2005, she released her debut solo album Handsome. Her second album, Bad Man, was released in 2013.

== Filmography ==
- Judging Amy (1999–2005) Creator, Writer, Producer
- Joan of Arcadia (2003–2005) Creator, Writer, Producer
- Army Wives (2008) Writer, Producer
- Madam Secretary (2014–2019) Creator, Writer, Producer

== Novels ==
- Skeeball and the Secret of the Universe (1987)
- Dixie Storms (1990)
- Fool's Hill (1992)
- A Better Place (1994)
- House Across the Cove 1995)
- Close to Home (1997)
- A Summons to New Orleans (2000)
- The Noah Confessions (2007)
- The Music Teacher (2009)
- Tempo Change (2009)
- Charisma (2013)

== Discography ==
=== The Enablers ===
- The First Seven Songs (2003)
- Come Back Soon (2004)

=== Solo ===
- Handsome (2005)
- Bad Man (2013)

== Awards ==
- Humanitas Prize for Television
- Television Critics Association Award
- TV Guide Award
- Catholics in Media Award
