= Morgan Freeman on screen and stage =

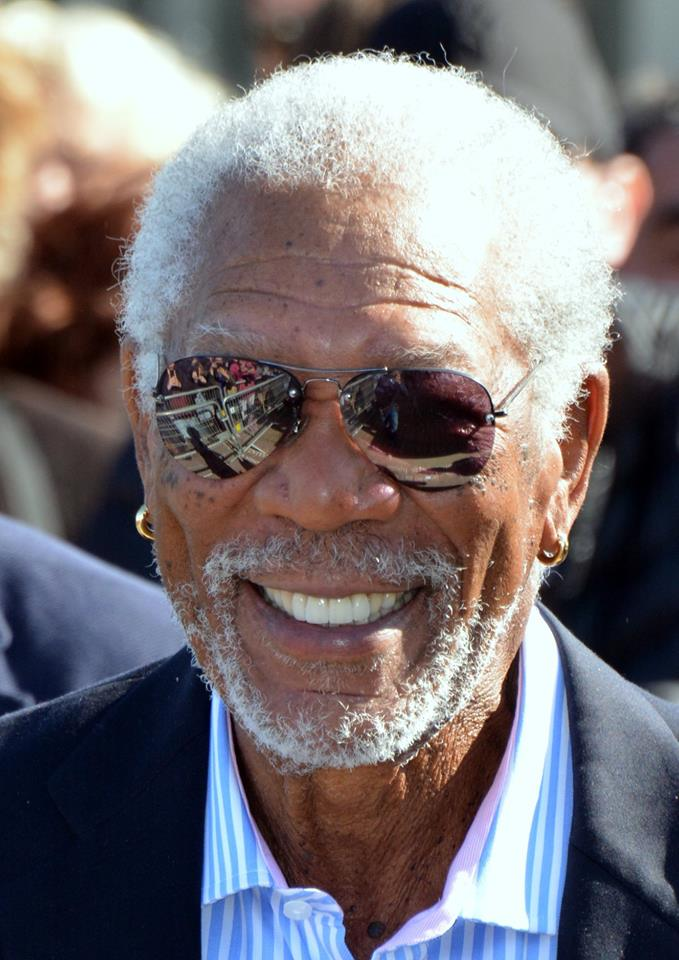
At Deauville American Film Festival in September 2018

Morgan Freeman is an American actor and producer who has had a prolific career on stage and screen. He is known for his deep resonant voice and the gravitas he has lent to his roles. Since making his film debut in 1964, Freeman is known for his roles in genres ranging from dramas, historical epics, thrillers, action adventure, science fiction, and comedies. In a 2022 readers' poll by Empire, he was voted one of the 50 greatest actors of all time.

His film debut was as an uncredited character in the Sidney Lumet–directed drama The Pawnbroker in 1964. Freeman also made his stage debut in the same year by appearing in the musical Hello, Dolly! He followed this with further stage appearances in The Niggerlovers (1967), The Dozens (1969), Exhibition (1969), and the musical Purlie (1970–1971). He played various characters on the children's television series The Electric Company (1971–1977). Freeman subsequently appeared in the films Teachers in 1984, and Marie in 1985 before making his breakthrough with 1987's Street Smart. His role earned him a nomination for the Academy Award for Best Supporting Actor. Two years later he appeared in war film Glory (1989), and starred as Hoke Coleburn in the comedy-drama Driving Miss Daisy (1989). (Note: Freeman had previously played the same character in the play of the same name from 1987 to 1990.) Freeman won the Golden Globe Award for Best Actor – Motion Picture Musical or Comedy for his performance in the latter and also earned a nomination for the Academy Award for Best Actor.

In the 1990s, he was cast in numerous films, including the adventure film Robin Hood: Prince of Thieves (1991) opposite Kevin Costner, drama The Shawshank Redemption (1994) with Tim Robbins, psychological thriller Seven (1995), historical drama Amistad (1997), crime thriller Kiss the Girls (1997), and science fiction disaster film Deep Impact (1998). His role in The Shawshank Redemption earned him a second nomination for the Academy Award for Best Actor. In 2003, he played God in the comedy Bruce Almighty opposite Jim Carrey. (Note: Freeman also reprised this role in the 2007 sequel Evan Almighty.) The following year Freeman played Eddie "Scrap Iron" Dupris in Clint Eastwood's film Million Dollar Baby (2004), for which he won an Academy Award for Best Supporting Actor.

Freeman played Lucius Fox in a trilogy of Batman films: Batman Begins (2005), The Dark Knight (2008), and The Dark Knight Rises (2012). During that time, Freeman also appeared in The Bucket List (2007) opposite Jack Nicholson, Wanted (2008) with Angelina Jolie, and Invictus (2009) with Matt Damon. In 2011, Freeman received the AFI Life Achievement Award from the American Film Institute. Two years later he starred in action thriller Olympus Has Fallen (2013), science fiction film Oblivion (2013), caper Now You See Me (2013), and comedy Last Vegas. In 2014, Freeman appeared in the science fiction films Transcendence and Lucy.

Freeman has also narrated several documentaries and television series, including Cosmic Voyage (1996), Slavery and the Making of America (2004), March of the Penguins (2005), and Breaking the Taboo (2011). He was also the host and narrator for the series Through the Wormhole from 2010 to 2017.

== Acting credits ==
=== Film ===
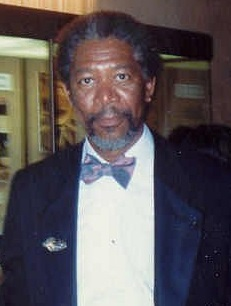
At the 62nd Annual Academy Awards in March 1990

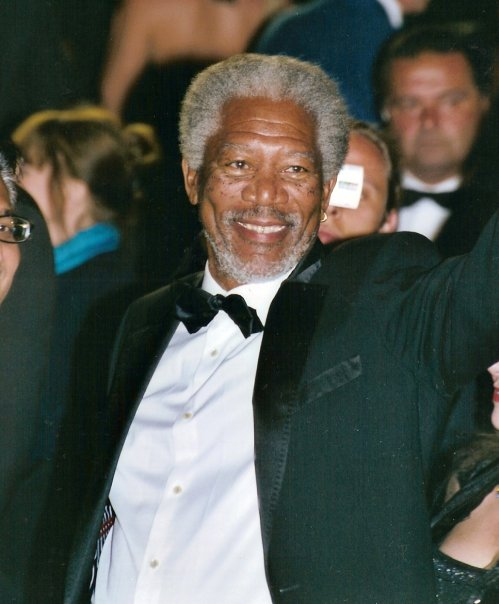
At the 2005 Cannes Film Festival

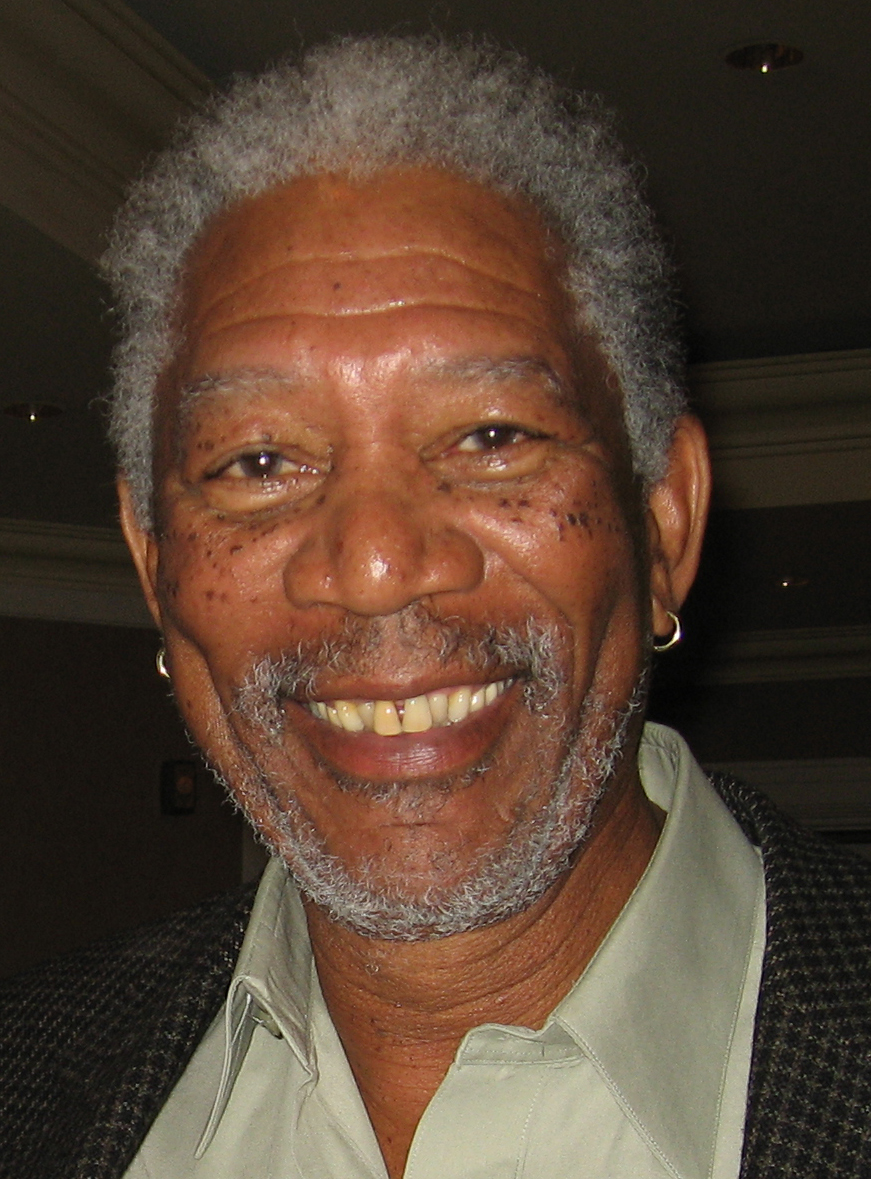
At a conference in Los Angeles, October 2006

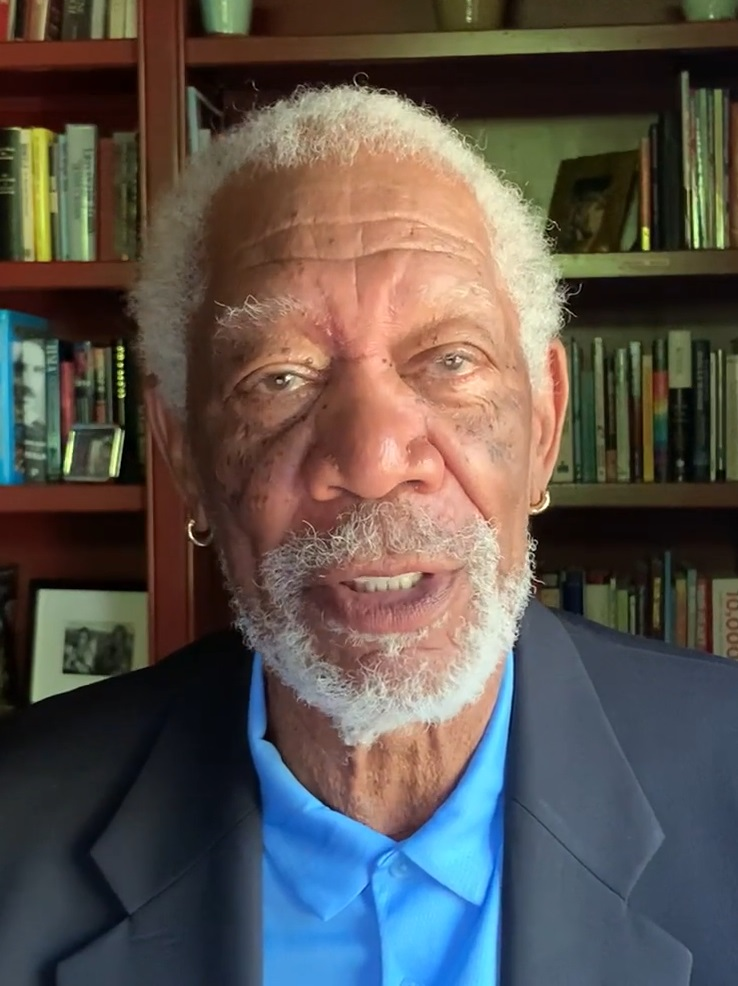
Morgan Freeman in 2022

Year	Title	Role	Notes	Ref.
1964	The Pawnbroker	Man on Street	Uncredited	
1966	A Man Called Adam	Party guest	Uncredited	
1968	Where Were You When the Lights Went Out?	Grand Central Commuter	Uncredited	
1971	Who Says I Can't Ride a Rainbow!	Afro		
1973	Blade	Chris		
1980	Brubaker	Walter		
1981	Eyewitness	Lieutenant Black		
1984	Teachers	Alan Lewis		
1984	Harry & Son	Siemanowski		
1985	Marie	Charles Traughber		
1985	That Was Then... This Is Now	Charlie		
1987	Street Smart	Fast Black		
1988	Clean and Sober	Craig		
1989	Glory	John Rawlins		
1989	Driving Miss Daisy	Hoke Colburn		
1989	Lean on Me	Joe Louis Clark		
1989	Johnny Handsome	Lt. Drones		
1990	The Civil War	Frederick Douglass	Voice	
1990	The Bonfire of the Vanities	Judge White		
1991	Robin Hood: Prince of Thieves	Azeem Edin Bashir Al Bakir		
1992	Unforgiven	Ned Logan		
1992	The Power of One	Geel Piet		
1993	Bopha!	—N/a	Director only	
1994	The Shawshank Redemption	Ellis Boyd "Red" Redding, Narrator		
1995	Outbreak	General Billy Ford		
1995	Seven	Detective Lieutenant William Somerset		
1996	Chain Reaction	Paul Shannon		
1996	Moll Flanders	Hibble		
1997	Amistad	Theodore Joadson		
1997	Kiss the Girls	Alex Cross		
1998	Deep Impact	President Beck		
1998	Hard Rain	Jim		
2000	Nurse Betty	Charlie		
2000	Under Suspicion	Victor Benezet	Also executive producer	
2001	Along Came a Spider	Alex Cross	Also executive producer	
2002	The Sum of All Fears	DCI William Cabot		
2002	High Crimes	Charlie Grimes		
2003	Bruce Almighty	God		
2003	Dreamcatcher	Col. Abraham Curtis		
2003	Levity	Pastor Miles Evans	Also executive producer	
2003	Guilty by Association	Lt. Redding		
2004	The Big Bounce	Walter Crewes		
2004	Million Dollar Baby	Eddie "Scrap Iron" Dupris		
2005	An Unfinished Life	Mitch		
2005	Batman Begins	Lucius Fox		
2005	Unleashed	Sam		
2005	Edison	Ashford		
2005	Magnificent Desolation: Walking on the Moon 3D	Neil Armstrong	Documentary	
2006	The Contract	Frank Carden		
2006	Lucky Number Slevin	The Boss		
2006	10 Items or Less	Himself	Also executive producer	
2007	Evan Almighty	God		
2007	Feast of Love	Harry Stevenson		
2007	Gone Baby Gone	Jack Doyle		
2007	The Bucket List	Carter Chambers		
2008	Wanted	Sloan		
2008	The Dark Knight	Lucius Fox		
2009	Thick as Thieves	Keith Ripley	Also known as The Code	
2009	The Maiden Heist	Charles Peterson		
2009	Invictus	Nelson Mandela	Also executive producer	
2010	RED	Joe Matheson		
2011	Dolphin Tale	Dr. McCarthy		
2012	The Magic of Belle Isle	Monte Wildhorn		
2012	The Dark Knight Rises	Lucius Fox		
2013	Olympus Has Fallen	Allan Trumbull, Speaker of the House		
2013	Oblivion	Beech		
2013	Now You See Me	Thaddeus Bradley		
2013	Last Vegas	Archie		
2014	The Lego Movie	Vitruvius	Voice	
2014	Transcendence	Joseph Tagger		
2014	Lucy	Professor Norman		
2014	Dolphin Tale 2	Dr. McCarthy		
2014	5 Flights Up	Alex	Also executive producer	
2014	Lennon or McCartney	Himself	Short documentary film; interview clip	
2015	Last Knights	Bartok		
2015	Ted 2	Patrick Meighan		
2015	Momentum	Senator		
2016	London Has Fallen	Vice President Allan Trumbull		
2016	Now You See Me 2	Thaddeus Bradley		
2016	Ben-Hur	Sheikh Ilderim		
2017	Going in Style	Willie		
2017	Just Getting Started	Duke Diver		
2018	The Nutcracker and the Four Realms	Drosselmeyer		
2018	Brian Banks	Jerome Johnson	Uncredited	
2019	Princess of the Row	—N/a	Executive producer only	
2019	The Killing of Kenneth Chamberlain	—N/a	Executive producer only	
2019	The Poison Rose	Doc		
2019	Angel Has Fallen	President Allan Trumbull		
2020	The Comeback Trail	Reggie Fontaine		
2021	Coming 2 America	Himself		
2021	Vanquish	Damon		
2021	Hitman's Wife's Bodyguard	Michael Bryce Sr./Senior		
2022	Paradise Highway	Gerick		
2022	The Minute You Wake Up Dead	Sheriff Thurmond Fowler		
2023	The Ritual Killer	Dr. Mackles		
2023	A Good Person	Daniel		
2023	57 Seconds	Anton Burrell		
2024	My Dead Friend Zoe	Dr. Cole		
2024	In Our Blood	—N/a	Executive producer only	
2024	Gunner	Kendrick Ryker		
2025	Now You See Me: Now You Don't	Thaddeus Bradley		
2027	Rode to Ruin †	Joseph Mulberry	Completed	

=== Television ===
Year	Title	Role	Notes	Ref.
1971–1977	The Electric Company	Easy Reader / Mel Mounds / Dracula / Vincent the Vegetable Vampire / Mark	Main role	
1978	Roll of Thunder, Hear My Cry	Uncle Hammer Logan	Television film	
1979	Hollow Image	Ralph Simmons "Sweet Talk"	Television film	
1980	Attica	Hap Richards	Television film	
1981	Ryan's Hope	Cicero Murphy	2 episodes	
1981	The Marva Collins Story	Clarence Collins	Television film	
1981	Death of a Prophet	Malcolm X	Television film	
1983	Another World	Dr. Roy Bingham	5 episodes	
1985	The Atlanta Child Murders	Ben Shelter	Miniseries	
1985	The Twilight Zone	Tony	Episode: "Dealer's Choice"	
1985	The Execution of Raymond Graham	Warden Pratt	TV Movie	
1986	Resting Place	Luther Johnson	Television film	
1987	Fight For Life	Dr. Sherard	Television film	
1988	Clinton and Nadine	Dorsey Pratt	Television film	
1990	The Earth Day Special	Walter Samson	TV special	
2008	Smithsonian Channel's Sound Revolution	Himself (host)	TV documentary	
2008	Stephen Fry in America	Himself	Episode: "Mississippi"	
2010	Saturday Night Live	Himself (cameo)	Episode: "Bryan Cranston/Kanye West"	
2014–2019	Madam Secretary	Chief Justice Frawley	3 episodes; also executive producer	
2016	2017 Breakthrough Prize Ceremony	Himself (host)	TV special	
2016–2019	The Story of God with Morgan Freeman	Himself (host)	Also executive producer	
2017	The Story of Us with Morgan Freeman	Himself (host)	Also executive producer	
2017	2018 Breakthrough Prize Ceremony	Himself (host)	TV special	
2020	Scooby-Doo and Guess Who?	Himself	Episode: "The Last Inmate!"	
2021	Solos	Stuart	1 episode	
2021	The Kominsky Method	Himself	2 episodes	
2023	The Muppets Mayhem	Himself	Cameo	
2023	761st Tank Battalion: The Original Black Panthers	Himself (host)	Also executive producer	
2023–present	Special Ops: Lioness	Edwin Mullins	Main role	

=== Theater ===
Year	Title	Role	Venue	Ref.
1967–1970	Hello, Dolly!	Rudolph	St. James Theatre	
1967	The Niggerlovers	Creampuff	Orpheum Theatre	
1969	The Dozens	Kgaravu	Booth Theatre	
1969	Exhibition	David	Actors' Playhouse	
1970–1971	Purlie	Purlie	Broadway Theatre / Winter Garden Theatre / August Wilson Theatre	
1978	The Mighty Gents	Zeke	Ambassador Theatre	
1978	White Pelicans	Winston	Lucille Lortel Theatre	
1979	Coriolanus	Caius Martius / Coriolanus	Joseph Papp Public Theater/Anspacher Theater/Delacorte Theater	
1979	Julius Caesar	Casca	Joseph Papp Public Theater/Anspacher Theater	
1980	Mother Courage and Her Children	Chaplain	Joseph Papp Public Theater/Newman Theater	
1983	Buck	Fred Milly	American Place Theatre	
1984	Medea and the Doll	Dr. Winston Crews	Samuel Beckett Theatre	
1987–1990	Driving Miss Daisy	Hoke Coleburn	John Houseman Theatre	
1988	The Gospel at Colonus	Messenger	Lunt-Fontanne Theatre	
1990	The Taming of the Shrew	Petruchio	Delacorte Theater	
2008	The Country Girl	Frank Elgin	Bernard B. Jacobs Theatre	
2011	8	David Boies	Eugene O'Neill Theatre	

== Narrator ==
Year	Title	Notes	Ref.
1994	Shelley Duvall's Bedtime Stories	Segment: "Amos, the Story of an Old Dog and His Couch"	
1996	Cosmic Voyage	Documentary	
1997	The Long Way Home	Documentary	
2003	A Tale of Two Schools	Documentary	
2004	The Hunting of the President	Documentary	
2004	A Remarkable Promise	Short film	
2004	Slavery and the Making of America	Documentary	
2005	March of the Penguins	Documentary	
2005	War of the Worlds	Narrative Feature	
2008	The Love Guru	Narrative Feature	
2008	A New Birth of Freedom	Documentary	
2009	Prom Night in Mississippi	Documentary	
2010–2017	Through the Wormhole	TV series (62 episodes)	
2011	Curiosity	Episode: "Is There a Parallel Universe?"	
2011	Born to Be Wild	Documentary	
2011	Breaking the Taboo	Documentary	
2011	Conan the Barbarian	Narrative Feature	
2013	JFK: A President Betrayed	Documentary	
2014	Island of Lemurs: Madagascar	Documentary	
2014	The Mona Lisa Myth	Documentary	
2016–2019	The Story of God with Morgan Freeman	TV series (15 episodes)	
2017	The Age of Spin: Dave Chappelle Live at the Hollywood Palladium	Stand-up special	
2017	Deep in the Heart of Texas: Dave Chappelle Live at Austin City Limits	Stand-up special	
2018	Alpha	Narrative Feature	
2020	Savage Mode II	Album (& album trailer)	
2021	Great Escapes with Morgan Freeman	TV documentary	
2022	Our Universe	Documentary	
2023	100 Years of Warner Bros	Television documentary	
2023	Life on Our Planet	Documentary	
2025	The Power of Chi	Documentary	
2026	The Dinosaurs	Documentary	

== Music videos ==
Year	Title	Artist	Role	Ref.
2002	"Waitin' on Joe"	Steve Azar	Narrator	

== Video games ==
Year	Title	Voice role	Ref.
2005	Batman Begins	Lucius Fox	
2009	Wanted: Weapons of Fate	Sloan	

== See also ==
- List of awards and nominations received by Morgan Freeman
