= List of awards and nominations received by Morgan Freeman =

Morgan Freeman awards and nominations
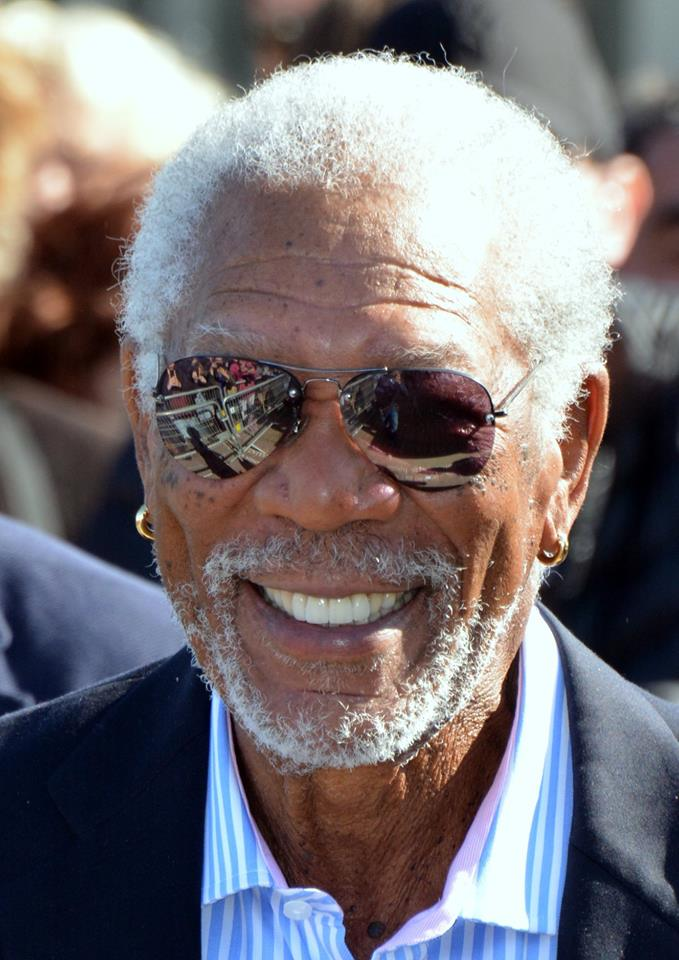
- Freeman at the Deauville Film Festival in 2018
Awards and nominations
Award	Wins	Nominations
Academy Awards	1	5
Emmy Awards	0	6
Golden Globe Awards	1	5
Screen Actors Guild Awards	1	4
Tony Awards	0	1

Totals (Note: Certain award groups do not simply award one winner. They acknowledge several different recipients, have runners-up, and have third place. Since this is a specific recognition and is different from losing an award, runner-up mentions are considered wins in this award tally. For simplification and to avoid errors, each award in this list has been presumed to have had a prior nomination.)
- Wins: 30
- Nominations: 80

Morgan Freeman is an American actor who has received several awards throughout his nearly seven-decade-long career, including an Academy Award, a Golden Globe Award and a Screen Actors Guild Award, as well as nominations for six Emmy Awards, a Grammy Award and a Tony Award.

He won the Academy Award for Best Supporting Actor for his role as a gym assistant and former boxer in the Clint Eastwood sports drama Million Dollar Baby (2004). He was Oscar-nominated for his performances as a pimp in Street Smart (1987), a chauffeur in Driving Miss Daisy (1989), a prison inmate in The Shawshank Redemption (1994), and Nelson Mandela in Invictus (2009). He also has earned the Golden Globe Award for Best Actor in a Musical or Comedy for Driving Miss Daisy and the Screen Actors Guild Award for Outstanding Supporting Actor for Million Dollar Baby (2004).

For his work on television, he earned a nomination for the Primetime Emmy Award for Outstanding Guest Actor in a Comedy Series for playing a fictionalized version of himself in the Netflix comedy series The Kominsky Method (2021). He also was Emmy-nominated for Outstanding Informational Series or Special for the National Geographic series The Story of God with Morgan Freeman (2016) and three nominations for Outstanding Narrator for the documentary series March of the Penguins 2: The Next Step (2018), Our Universe (2023), and Life on Our Planet (2024).

Freeman earned a nomination for the Tony Award for Best Featured Actor in a Play for his role as Zeke in the Broadway play The Mighty Gents (1978). For his lifetime achievement in acting he received the Kennedy Center Honors in 2008. His other honorary awards include the AFI Life Achievement Award in 2011, the Cecil B. DeMille Award in 2012 and the Screen Actors Guild Life Achievement Award in 2018.

== Major awards ==
=== Academy Awards ===
Year	Category	Nominated work	Result	Ref.
1988	Best Supporting Actor	Street Smart	Nominated	
1990	Best Actor	Driving Miss Daisy	Nominated	
1995	Best Actor	The Shawshank Redemption	Nominated	
2005	Best Supporting Actor	Million Dollar Baby	Won	
2010	Best Actor	Invictus	Nominated	

=== Critics' Choice Awards ===
Year	Category	Nominated work	Result	Ref.
Critics' Choice Movie Awards
2004	Best Supporting Actor	Million Dollar Baby	Nominated	
2007	Best Cast	Gone Baby Gone	Nominated	
2008	Best Cast	The Dark Knight	Nominated	
2009	Best Actor	Invictus	Nominated	

=== Emmy Awards ===
Year	Category	Nominated work	Result	Ref.
Primetime Emmy Awards
2016	Outstanding Informational Series or Special	The Story of God with Morgan Freeman	Nominated	
2018	Outstanding Narrator	March of the Penguins 2: The Next Step	Nominated	
2021	Outstanding Guest Actor in a Comedy Series	The Kominsky Method (episode: "The Round Toes, of the High Shoes")	Nominated	
2023	Outstanding Narrator	Our Universe (episode: "Chasing Starlight")	Nominated	
2024	Outstanding Narrator	Life on Our Planet (episode: "The Rules of Life")	Nominated	
News and Documentary Emmy Awards
2012	Outstanding Science and Technology Programming	Through the Wormhole	Nominated	

=== Golden Globe Awards ===
Year	Category	Nominated work	Result	Ref.
1988	Best Supporting Actor – Motion Picture	Street Smart	Nominated	
1990	Best Actor – Motion Picture Musical or Comedy	Driving Miss Daisy	Won	
1995	Best Actor – Motion Picture Drama	The Shawshank Redemption	Nominated	
2005	Best Supporting Actor – Motion Picture	Million Dollar Baby	Nominated	
2010	Best Actor – Motion Picture Drama	Invictus	Nominated	
Non-competitive awards
2012	Cecil B. DeMille Award		Recipient	

=== Grammy Awards ===
Year	Category	Nominated work	Result	Ref.
1996	Best Spoken Word Album for Children	Follow the Drinkin' Gourd	Nominated	

=== Screen Actors Guild Awards ===
Year	Category	Nominated work	Result	Ref.
1995	Outstanding Male Actor in a Leading Role	The Shawshank Redemption	Nominated	
2005	Outstanding Male Actor in a Supporting Role	Million Dollar Baby	Won	
2005	Outstanding Cast in a Motion Picture	Million Dollar Baby	Nominated	
2010	Outstanding Male Actor in a Leading Role	Invictus	Nominated	
Non-competitive awards
2017	Screen Actors Guild Life Achievement Award		Recipient	

=== Tony Awards ===
Year	Category	Nominated work	Result	Ref.
1978	Best Featured Actor in a Play	The Mighty Gents	Nominated	

== Critics awards ==
Organizations	Year	Category	Project	Result	Ref.
Chicago Film Critics Association	1989	Best Supporting Actor	Glory	Nominated	
Chicago Film Critics Association	1994	Best Supporting Actor	The Shawshank Redemption	Nominated	
Chicago Film Critics Association	1995	Best Actor	Se7en	Nominated	
Dallas-Fort Worth Film Critics Association	1994	Best Actor	The Shawshank Redemption	Won	
Dallas-Fort Worth Film Critics Association	2004	Best Supporting Actor	Million Dollar Baby	Nominated	
Dallas-Fort Worth Film Critics Association	2009	Best Actor	Invictus	Nominated	
Drama Desk Awards	1978	Outstanding Featured Actor in a Play	The Mighty Gents	Won	
Kansas City Film Critics Circle	1989	Best Actor	Driving Miss Daisy	Won	
London Film Critics Circle	1995	Actor of the Year	Se7en	Won	
Los Angeles Film Critics Association	1987	Best Supporting Actor	Street Smart	Won	
Los Angeles Film Critics Association	1989	Best Actor	Driving Miss Daisy	Nominated	
Los Angeles Film Critics Association	1989	Best Actor	Glory	Nominated	
Los Angeles Film Critics Association	1989	Best Actor	Lean on Me	Nominated	
Los Angeles Film Critics Association	1989	Best Actor	Johnny Handsome	Nominated	
Los Angeles Film Critics Association	2004	Best Supporting Actor	Million Dollar Baby	Nominated	
National Society of Film Critics	1987	Best Supporting Actor	Street Smart	Won	
National Society of Film Critics	1989	Best Actor	Driving Miss Daisy	Nominated	
National Society of Film Critics	1995	Best Actor	Se7en	Won	
National Society of Film Critics	2004	Best Supporting Actor	Million Dollar Baby	Nominated	
New York Film Critics Circle	1987	Best Supporting Actor	Street Smart	Won	
New York Film Critics Circle	1989	Best Actor	Driving Miss Daisy	Nominated	
Vancouver Film Critics Circle	2004	Best Supporting Actor	Million Dollar Baby	Won	
Washington D.C. Area Film Critics Association	2004	Best Supporting Actor	Million Dollar Baby	Nominated	
Washington D.C. Area Film Critics Association	2009	Best Actor	Invictus	Nominated	

== Miscellaneous awards ==
Organizations	Year	Category	Project	Result	Ref.
Berlin International Film Festival	1989	Silver Bear for Best Acting Team (shared with Jessica Tandy)	Driving Miss Daisy	Won	
Black Reel Awards	2000	Best Actor	Nurse Betty	Nominated	
Black Reel Awards	2002	Best Supporting Actor	The Sum of All Fears	Nominated	
Black Reel Awards	2003	Best Supporting Actor	Bruce Almighty	Nominated	
Black Reel Awards	2004	Best Supporting Actor	Million Dollar Baby	Nominated	
Black Reel Awards	2009	Best Actor	Invictus	Won	
Black Reel Awards	2015	Best Voice Performance	The Lego Movie	Won	
Blockbuster Entertainment Awards	1996	Favorite Actor – Mystery/Thriller	Seven	Won	
Empire Award	1995	Best Actor	Seven	Won	
Independent Spirit Award	1987	Best Supporting Male	Street Smart	Won	
MTV Movie Awards	1991	Best On-Screen Duo (shared with Kevin Costner)	Robin Hood: Prince of Thieves	Nominated	
MTV Movie Awards	1995	Best On-Screen Duo (shared with Brad Pitt)	Seven	Nominated	
NAACP Image Awards	1989	Outstanding Actor in a Motion Picture	Driving Miss Daisy	Won	
NAACP Image Awards	1989	Outstanding Actor in a Motion Picture	Lean on Me	Won	
NAACP Image Awards	1995	Outstanding Actor in a Motion Picture	Seven	Nominated	
NAACP Image Awards	1997	Outstanding Supporting Actor in a Motion Picture	Amistad	Won	
NAACP Image Awards	1998	Outstanding Supporting Actor in a Motion Picture	Deep Impact	Won	
NAACP Image Awards	2000	Outstanding Supporting Actor in a Motion Picture	Nurse Betty	Nominated	
NAACP Image Awards	2001	Outstanding Supporting Actor in a Motion Picture	Along Came a Spider	Nominated	
NAACP Image Awards	2002	Outstanding Actor in a Motion Picture	High Crimes	Nominated	
NAACP Image Awards	2003	Outstanding Supporting Actor in a Motion Picture	Bruce Almighty	Won	
NAACP Image Awards	2004	Outstanding Supporting Actor in a Motion Picture	Million Dollar Baby	Won	
NAACP Image Awards	2009	Outstanding Actor in a Motion Picture	Invictus	Won	
NAACP Image Awards	2010	Outstanding Actor in a Motion Picture	Red	Nominated	
NAACP Image Awards	2012	Outstanding Actor in a Motion Picture	The Magic of Belle Isle	Nominated	
National Board of Review	1989	Best Actor	Driving Miss Daisy	Won	
National Board of Review	2009	Best Actor (tied with George Clooney for Up in the Air)	Invictus	Won	
People's Choice Award	2008	Favorite Cast	The Dark Knight	Won	
Saturn Award	1995	Best Actor	Seven	Nominated	
Satellite Award	2000	Best Actor - Motion Picture Musical or Comedy	Nurse Betty	Nominated	
Teen Choice Awards	2003	Choice Movie Chemistry	Bruce Almighty	Nominated	

== Honorary awards ==
Organizations	Year	Notes	Result	Ref.
American Academy of Achievement	1998	Golden Plate Award	Honored	
Hollywood Walk of Fame	2003	Star on the Walk of Fame	Honored	
Cairo International Film Festival	2006	Lifetime Achievement Award	Honored	
John F. Kennedy Center for the Performing Arts	2008	Kennedy Center Honors	Honored	
Zurich Film Festival	2009	Golden Icon Award	Honored	
Sarajevo Film Festival	2010	Honorary Heart of Sarajevo Award	Honored	
Living Legends of Aviation	2011	Aviation Inspiration and Patriotism Award	Honored	
American Film Institute	2011	AFI Life Achievement Award	Honored	
Golden Globe Awards	2012	Cecil B. DeMille Award	Honored	
City of London	2014	Freedom of the City	Honored	
Screen Actors Guild Award	2017	Screen Actors Guild Life Achievement Award	Honored	

== Honorary degrees ==
Organizations	Year	Notes	Ref.
Rhodes College	1997	Honorary degree	
Brown University	2010	Honorary degree	
Boston University	2013	Honorary degree (Doctor of Humane Letters)	
