= Our Universe =

Our Universe may refer to:

- Our Universe (American TV series)
- Our Universe (South Korean TV series)
