= Smithsonian Channel's Sound Revolution =

- Starring: Morgan Freeman; B. B. King; Buddy Guy; Etta James; Ike Turner; Clarence 'Gatemouth' Brown; Davell Crawford
- Country of origin: United States
- No. of episodes: 6

Production
- Running time: 46 minutes

Original release
- Network: Smithsonian Networks
- Release: November 16, 2008

Smithsonian Channel's Sound Revolution is a documentary television series hosted by award-winning actor Morgan Freeman. Documentary footage, expert interviews and musical performances trace the origins of be-bop, jazz, rock 'n' roll and soul music, all emanating from “ground zero” – Clarksdale, Mississippi – and the Mississippi Delta. Each hour-long program is filled with recent performances, largely from the Montreux Jazz Festival, featuring performances by: B. B. King, Ike Tuner, Buddy Guy, Etta James, Eric Clapton, Carlos Santana, Robert Cray, Miles Davis, The Neville Brothers and many others. The show premiered in November 2008 on Smithsonian Networks. It was scripted by British writer Joe Cushley, directed by Chris Walker and produced by Alan Ravenscroft.

== Episodes ==
=== Season 1 (2008) ===
1. Blues Beginnings
2. Traveling Blues
3. Sounds of Jazz
4. Free Jazz to Future Jazz
5. Soul Stirrings
6. Heart of Soul

== Featured individuals ==
- Ray Charles, featured in the episode "Soul Stirrings".
