= Starletta DuPois =

American actress (born 1941)

- Born: July 18, 1941 (age 85); Philadelphia, Pennsylvania, U.S.
- Occupation: Actress
- Years active: 1974–present

Starletta DuPois (born July 18, 1941) is an American actress. She has appeared in more than 90 films and television shows during her career. She received a Tony Award nomination for Best Featured Actress in a Play for her performance in The Mighty Gents (1978).

== Life and career ==
DuPois, who is of African American heritage, was born and raised in Philadelphia, Pennsylvania. She graduated from University of Maryland Eastern Shore in 1968, and received her M.F.A. in Theatre Arts from UCLA School of Theater, Film and Television. She made her Broadway debut appearing in 1974 short-lived play What the Wine-Sellers Buy. Later that year, she had minor roles in films Death Wish and The Gambler. In 1976, she starred in the Off-Broadway production of So Nice, They Named it Twice.

In 1978, DuPois received a Tony Award nomination for Best Featured Actress in a Play for her performance in the original production of The Mighty Gents opposite Dorian Harewood. She later played Ruth Younger in the Union Square Theatre's A Raisin in the Sun, and appeared in Longacre Theatre's musical Don't Get God Started. At the same time, DuPois began appearing on television, playing guest-starring roles on The Jeffersons, Little House on the Prairie, Knots Landing, Hill Street Blues, CHiPs and St. Elsewhere. In 1989, she received NAACP Image Award for American Playhouse production of A Raisin in the Sun. She later returned to play, but in role of Lena Younger, in the Royal Exchange Theatre 2010 production receiving positive review from The Guardian. Her other theatre credits including Intimate Apparel, Before It Hits Home, King Hedley II, Miss Evers Boys, Fences, The Piano Lesson and Joe Turner's Come and Gone.

During her career, DuPois played supporting roles in a more that 50 movies. She appeared in Pee-wee's Big Adventure (1985), Odd Jobs (1986), Hollywood Shuffle (1987), Ricochet (1991), The Waterdance (1992), South Central (1992), The Thing Called Love (1993), and Wolf (1994). She starred opposite James Earl Jones in the 1991 Western film Convicts and played Whitney Houston' character mother in the 1995 comedy-drama film, Waiting to Exhale. She later appeared in films 3 Strikes (2000), Big Momma's House (2000), Friday After Next (2002), The Notebook (2004), First Sunday (2008), True to the Game trilogy (2017–2021), and Charming the Hearts of Men (2021).

On television, DuPois appeared in made-for-television movies, include The Kid with the 200 I.Q. (1983), Wes Craven's Chiller (1985), Runaway Father (1991), Strapped (1993), The Road to Galveston (1996), Full Circle (1996) and Michael Jackson: Searching for Neverland (2017). From 2017 to 2021 she starred in the streaming television comedy series, The Rich and the Ruthless opposite Victoria Rowell. Her other television credits including guest appearances on The Steve Harvey Show, Chicago Hope, The District, Lost, Cold Case and Black Jesus.

== Filmography ==
=== Film ===
Starletta DuPois film credits
Year	Title	Role
1974	Death Wish	Lady at Police Station (uncredited)
1974	The Gambler	Monique (uncredited)
1980	The Torture of Mothers	Mother
1985	Pee-wee's Big Adventure	Sgt. Hunter
1986	Odd Jobs	Dwight's Mom
1987	Hollywood Shuffle	Bobby's Mother
1991	Ricochet	Mrs. Styles
1991	Convicts	Martha Johnson
1991	Last Breeze of Summer	Sarah Davis
1992	The Waterdance	Florence
1992	South Central	Nurse Shelly
1993	Let's Get Bizzee	Mrs. Baker
1993	The Thing Called Love	Selma
1994	Wolf	Victim's Mother
1995	Waiting to Exhale	Savannah's Mother
1997	The Maker	Technician
2000	3 Strikes	Moms Douglas
2000	Big Momma's House	Miss Patterson
2002	Friday After Next	Sister Sarah
2004	The Notebook	Nurse Esther
2005	Duck	Social Worker
2005	Family Reunion	Mabel Green
2008	First Sunday	Grandmother
2009	The Least Among You	Bessie Benton
2012	Dead Money	Delores
2012	A Beautiful Soul	Deaconess
2016	Mosaic	Aunt Nell
2017	True to the Game	Gah-Git
2017	A Teacher's Touch	Narvie Harris
2020	Death of a Telemarketer	Mrs. Gordon
2020	Magic Max	Mrs. Chambers
2020	True to the Game 2	Gah-Git
2021	Charming the Hearts of Men	Mattie
2021	True to the Game 3	Gah-Git
2023	A Haitian Wedding	
2023	Soul Mates	Allison's Grandmother Marie
2023	Heart for the Holidays	
2024	No More Goodbyes	
2025	One Battle After Another	Gramma Minnie

=== Television ===
Starletta DuPois television credits
Year	Title	Role	Notes
1980	The Jeffersons	Donna	1 episode
1981	Little House on the Prairie	Freda	Episode: "Make a Joyful Noise"
1981	Hill Street Blues	2nd Neighbor / 2nd Woman	2 episodes
1981	CHiPs	Lauren Collier	1 episode
1983–1992	Knots Landing	Chip's Nurse / Nurse Benson	2 episodes
1984	St. Elsewhere	Dora Chambers	2 episodes
1987	The Equalizer	Female Detective	Episode: "Inner View"
1982	Games Mother Never Taught You	Ann	TV movie
1983	The Kid with the 200 I.Q.	Minna Newell	TV movie
1985	Deadly Intentions	Security Lady	TV movie
1985	Wes Craven's Chiller	Nurse	TV movie
1989	American Playhouse	Ruth Younger	TV movie: A Raisin in the Sun
1991	Runaway Father	Ruth	TV movie
1993	Frogs!	Principal Caverly	TV movie
1993	Strapped	Diquan's Mother	TV movie
1994	A Passion for Justice: The Hazel Brannon Smith Story	Ruth	TV movie
1996	The Road to Galveston	Sally, Jordan's Blind Friend	TV movie
1996	Full Circle	Miriam Black	TV movie
1997	Alone	Lois	TV movie
1998	The Steve Harvey Show	Ms. Pittman	1 episode
1998	Chicago Hope	Arlene	1 episode
2003	The District	Kay Gilson	2 episodes
2008	Lost	Mrs. Dawson	2 episodes
2008	Cold Case	Mrs. Harris	1 episode
2014–2019	Black Jesus	Protester #1 / Miss Evans	2 episodes
2017	Michael Jackson: Searching for Neverland	Katherine Jackson	TV movie
2017–2019	The Rich and the Ruthless	Grandma Jones	18 episodes
2026	Bass X Machina	Etta (voice)	Upcoming series
