= Who Says I Can't Ride a Rainbow! =

- Directed by: Edward Andrew Mann
- Written by: Daniel Hauer; Edward Andrew Mann
- Produced by: Amin Q. Chaudhri; Jerry Hammer
- Starring: Jack Klugman
- Cinematography: Amin Q. Chaudhri; Sid Katz
- Edited by: Sidney Katz
- Music by: Bobby Scott
- Production company: Equine Productions
- Distributed by: Transvue Pictures
- Release date: November 18, 1971 (New York City)
- Running time: 85 minutes
- Country: United States
- Language: English

Who Says I Can't Ride a Rainbow! is a 1971 American family drama film directed by Edward Andrew Mann and starring Jack Klugman. It also features Morgan Freeman in his first credited film appearance. It is based on the true story of Barney Morowitz, who "struggled to maintain a pony stable in Greenwich Village."

== Cast ==
- Jack Klugman as Barney
- Norma French as Mary Lee
- Todd Hammer as Toadas
- Reuben Figueroa as Angel
- David Mann as David
- Kevin Riou as Kevin
- Val Avery as The Marshal
- Morgan Freeman as Afro
- Skitch Henderson as himself
- Heather MacRae as herself
- Oatis Stephens as himself

== Production ==
Principal photography occurred in January 1970 in New York City.
