= The Mighty Gents =

Play by Richard Wesley

- Original language: English
- Written by: Richard Wesley
- Characters: Zeke, Frankie, Rita, Tiny
- Genre: Drama

Premiere
- Date: 1978

The Mighty Gents is a 1978 play which originally starred Morgan Freeman and Dorian Harewood in its Broadway theater debut.

== Synopsis ==
The story of former gang members in Newark, New Jersey.

== Production history ==
Richard Wesley began writing what would become The Might Gents after graduating from Howard University. It was first titled The Street Corner, then The Last Street Play, then finally The Mighty Gents. As The Last Street Play, it was first performed at the Urban Arts Corps in New York in 1976. In May 1977, it was produced by the Manhattan Theatre Club. The following year, it was staged at the Kennedy Center in March 1978 and opened on Broadway as The Mighty Gents.

The Broadway production opened on April 16, 1978 at the Ambassador Theatre, and closed on April 23, 1978. It was directed by Harold Scott, with scenery by Santo Loquasto, costumes by Judy Dearing, and lighting by Gilbert V. Hemsley. The cast included Dorian Harewood as Frankie, Starletta DuPois as Rita, Morgan Freeman as Zeke, Howard Rollins as Braxton, Frank Adu as Father, Brent Jennings as Tiny, Richard Gant as Eldridge, and Mansoor Najee-Ullah as Lucky.

In August 1979, the New York Shakespeare Festival put on a new production of The Mighty Gents at Pier 84 in Manhattan.

== Critical reception ==
The Washington Post called a 1978 staging of The Mighty Gents "An effective, generally first-class staging of Richard Wesley's drama." Morgan Freeman was nominated for the 1978 Drama Desk Award for Outstanding Featured Actor and the 1978 Tony Award for Best Performance by and Actor in a Featured Role, though he did not win either category. Starletta Dupois was nominated for the 1978 Tony Award for Best Performance by an Actress in a Featured Role in a Play.
