= The Niggerlovers =

1967 play by George Tabori

- Original language: English
- Music by: George Tabori
- Lyrics by: George Tabori
- Characters: Freckles, Creampuff

Premiere
- Date: 1967

The Niggerlovers was a 1967 play and featured the debut of Morgan Freeman; the original New York version starred Freeman, Stacy Keach and Viveca Lindfors.

== Overview ==
A white professor lays his life on the line for social justice and is schooled by two African Americans, Freckles and Creampuff.
