= Guilty by Association (film) =

- Directed by: Po Johns; Howard Gibson
- Written by: Howard Gibson
- Starring: Jeff Edward; Daemon Moore; Morgan Freeman
- Distributed by: Artisan Entertainment
- Release date: July 22, 2003
- Running time: 85 minutes
- Country: United States
- Language: English

Guilty by Association is a 2003 American action crime drama film written by Howard Gibson, directed by Gibson and Po Johns and starring Jeff Edward and Daemon Moore and features Morgan Freeman in a small role. The film also features Bryce Wilson in his acting debut. Co-director Po Johns also appears in the film, playing dual roles. Due to marketing/publicity reasons, Freeman appears on the cover of the DVD release.

== Cast ==
- Jeff Edward as Drama
- Daemon Moore as D-Mo
- Morgan Freeman as Police Lieutenant Redding
- Bryce Wilson as Kenny
- Po Johns as Dumb Donald and Po
- Jammie Patton as Nikki
- Brant von Hoffman as Stanley

== Release ==
The film was released via direct-to-DVD on July 22, 2003.

== Reception ==
TV Guide gave the film a negative review: "Freeman must have been drawn to this project's sincerity, but even his magisterial presence can't lend depth to such a clumsily constructed cautionary tale."

Andy Patrizio of IGN scored the film a 4 out of 10 and wrote, "The bottom line is there's nothing we haven't seen before, and done better."
