= AFI Life Achievement Award =

Award given by the American Film Institute

- Logo of AFI
- Awarded for: Honoring an individual whose lifetime contribution in motion pictures and television has enriched American culture.
- Location: Los Angeles
- Presented by: American Film Institute
- Reward: Trophy
- First award: 1973; 53 years ago
- Currently held by: Eddie Murphy
- Website: afi.com

Television/radio coverage
- Network: Netflix

The AFI Life Achievement Award was established by the board of directors of the American Film Institute (AFI) on February 26, 1973, to honor a single individual for their lifetime contribution to enriching the American culture through motion pictures and television. The recipient is selected and honored at an annual ceremony, with the award presented by a master of ceremonies and, recently, by the prior year's recipient.

The AFI's trustees initially specified that "The recipient must be one who fundamentally advanced the art of film and whose achievements had been acknowledged by film scholars, critics, their individual peers and the general public". The trustees also specified "That the work of the recipient must have withstood the test of time".

== History of the award ==
Director John Ford was the unanimous choice of the board of trustees for the first award as he "clearly stands preeminent in the history of motion pictures."

President Richard Nixon attended the gala dinner at which Ford was presented the award on March 31, 1973.

The board of trustees later amended the "test of time" requirement to enable the AFI Life Achievement Award to be presented to individuals with active careers, such as Steven Spielberg.

== Trivia and firsts ==
Lillian Gish was awarded the AFI Life Achievement Award in 1984, aged 90, becoming the oldest recipient of the prize; Mel Brooks and Francis Ford Coppola are the oldest male recipients, awarded at age 86 in 2013 and 2025, respectively. Tom Hanks was awarded the AFI Life Achievement Award in 2002, becoming the youngest recipient of the prize at age 46, and Meryl Streep was the youngest female, awarded at age 54 in 2004.

Of the 51 honorees eleven have been women: Bette Davis (the first female recipient), Lillian Gish, Barbara Stanwyck, Elizabeth Taylor, Barbra Streisand, Meryl Streep, Shirley MacLaine, Jane Fonda, Diane Keaton, Julie Andrews, and Nicole Kidman.

Composer John Williams was the first award recipient not to be an actor or director.

Three sets of family members have received the award: father and son Kirk and Michael Douglas, father and daughter Henry and Jane Fonda, and siblings Warren Beatty and Shirley MacLaine.

Julie Andrews' award event was originally scheduled for April 25, 2020, with a broadcast on May 7 on TNT, but the event was postponed to 2021, due to the COVID-19 pandemic. This marks the first time an AFI Life Achievement Award event was delayed. The event was rescheduled for November 11, 2021, before it was postponed a second time on October 4, 2021.

Nicole Kidman’s ceremony was originally scheduled for June 10, 2023, but was postponed due to the 2023 Writers Guild of America strike. Kidman is also the first Australian actress to receive the award, and the third non-American actress to be honored after British stars Elizabeth Taylor and Julie Andrews.

== Televised broadcast ==
All Life Achievement Award ceremonies have been televised on major TV networks and cable channels: CBS, NBC, ABC, Fox, USA, TV Land, TNT, and TBS. Agreeing to appear at the televised ceremony is part of the AFI's criteria for selecting the award. The televised ceremony generates income for the AFI, no longer funded by the US government.

In 2026, Eddie Murphy's tribute was the first to be broadcast on Netflix.

== Recipients ==
The American Film Institute has awarded one person the AFI Life Achievement Award each year since 1973. The 52nd Award will be presented to Tom Cruise in Los Angeles on April 24, 2027.

#	Year	Honoree	Image	Profession	Age	Date of Ceremony	Network	Award Presenter/Host
1	1973	John Ford		Director	79	March 31, 1973	CBS	Danny Kaye
2	1974	James Cagney		Actor	74	March 31, 1974	CBS	Frank Sinatra
3	1975	Orson Welles		Actor, director, screenwriter	59	February 9, 1975	CBS	Frank Sinatra
4	1976	William Wyler		Director	73	March 9, 1976	CBS	Gregory Peck
5	1977	Bette Davis		Actress	68	March 1, 1977	CBS	Jane Fonda
6	1978	Henry Fonda		Actor	72	March 15, 1978	CBS	—N/a
7	1979	Alfred Hitchcock		Director	79	March 7, 1979	CBS	Ingrid Bergman
8	1980	James Stewart		Actor	71	March 16, 1980	CBS	Henry Fonda
9	1981	Fred Astaire		Actor	81	April 10, 1981	CBS	David Niven
10	1982	Frank Capra		Director	84	March 4, 1982	CBS	James Stewart
11	1983	John Huston		Actor, director, screenwriter	76	March 3, 1983	CBS	Lauren Bacall
12	1984	Lillian Gish		Actress	90	March 1, 1984	CBS	Douglas Fairbanks Jr.
13	1985	Gene Kelly		Actor, director	72	March 7, 1985	CBS	Shirley MacLaine
14	1986	Billy Wilder		Director, screenwriter	79	March 6, 1986	NBC	Jack Lemmon
15	1987	Barbara Stanwyck		Actress	79	April 9, 1987	ABC	Jane Fonda
16	1988	Jack Lemmon		Actor	63	March 10, 1988	CBS	Julie Andrews
17	1989	Gregory Peck		Actor	72	March 9, 1989	NBC	Audrey Hepburn
18	1990	David Lean		Director, screenwriter	82	March 8, 1990	ABC	Gregory Peck
19	1991	Kirk Douglas		Actor	74	March 7, 1991	CBS	Michael Douglas
20	1992	Sidney Poitier		Actor, director	65	March 12, 1992	NBC	Harry Belafonte
21	1993	Elizabeth Taylor		Actress	61	March 11, 1993	ABC	Carol Burnett
22	1994	Jack Nicholson		Actor	56	March 3, 1994	CBS	Mike Nichols
23	1995	Steven Spielberg		Director, screenwriter	48	March 2, 1995	NBC	Sidney Sheinberg
24	1996	Clint Eastwood		Actor, director	65	February 29, 1996	ABC	Steven Spielberg
25	1997	Martin Scorsese		Director, screenwriter	54	February 20, 1997	CBS	Gregory Peck
26	1998	Robert Wise		Director	83	February 19, 1998	NBC	Julie Andrews
27	1999	Dustin Hoffman		Actor	61	February 18, 1999	ABC	Jack Nicholson
28	2000	Harrison Ford		Actor	57	February 17, 2000	CBS	George Lucas & Steven Spielberg
29	2001	Barbra Streisand		Actress, director	58	February 22, 2001	Fox	Sidney Poitier
30	2002	Tom Hanks		Actor	46	June 24, 2002	USA Network	Steven Spielberg
31	2003	Robert De Niro		Actor	59	June 12, 2003	USA Network	Martin Scorsese
32	2004	Meryl Streep		Actress	54	June 21, 2004	USA Network	Mike Nichols
33	2005	George Lucas		Director, screenwriter	61	June 9, 2005	USA Network	Steven Spielberg
34	2006	Sean Connery		Actor	75	June 8, 2006	USA Network	Harrison Ford
35	2007	Al Pacino		Actor	67	June 7, 2007	USA Network	Sean Penn
36	2008	Warren Beatty		Actor, director, screenwriter	71	June 12, 2008	USA Network	Al Pacino
37	2009	Michael Douglas		Actor	64	June 11, 2009	TV Land	Jack Nicholson
38	2010	Mike Nichols		Director	78	June 10, 2010	TV Land	Meryl Streep
39	2011	Morgan Freeman		Actor	74	June 9, 2011	TV Land	Clint Eastwood
40	2012	Shirley MacLaine		Actress	78	June 7, 2012	TV Land	Meryl Streep
41	2013	Mel Brooks		Actor, director, screenwriter	86	June 15, 2013	TNT	Martin Scorsese
42	2014	Jane Fonda		Actress	76	June 13, 2014	TNT	Michael Douglas
43	2015	Steve Martin		Actor, screenwriter	69	June 4, 2015	TBS	Mel Brooks
44	2016	John Williams		Composer	84	June 9, 2016	TNT	Steven Spielberg
45	2017	Diane Keaton		Actress	71	June 8, 2017	TNT	Woody Allen
46	2018	George Clooney		Actor, director, screenwriter	57	June 7, 2018	TNT	Shirley MacLaine
47	2019	Denzel Washington		Actor	64	June 6, 2019	TNT	Spike Lee
–	2020	No award						
–	2021	No award						
48	2022	Julie Andrews		Actress	86	June 9, 2022	TNT	Carol Burnett
–	2023	No award						
49	2024	Nicole Kidman		Actress	56	April 27, 2024	TNT	Meryl Streep
50	2025	Francis Ford Coppola		Director, screenwriter	86	April 26, 2025	TNT	George Lucas & Steven Spielberg
51	2026	Eddie Murphy		Actor	65	April 18, 2026	Netflix	Spike Lee
52	2027	Tom Cruise		Actor	64	April 24, 2027		

== See also ==
- Cecil B. DeMille Award
