= Street Smart (1987 film) =

1987 film directed by Jerry Schatzberg

- Theatrical release poster
- Directed by: Jerry Schatzberg
- Written by: David Freeman
- Produced by: Yoram Globus; Menahem Golan
- Starring: Christopher Reeve; Kathy Baker; Mimi Rogers; Jay Patterson; Andre Gregory; Morgan Freeman
- Cinematography: Adam Holender
- Edited by: Priscilla Nedd
- Music by: Robert Irving III; Miles Davis
- Production company: Golan-Globus Productions
- Distributed by: Cannon Group
- Release date: March 20, 1987
- Running time: 97 minutes
- Country: United States
- Budget: $6 million
- Box office: $1,119,112

Street Smart is a 1987 American crime thriller film directed by Jerry Schatzberg and starring Christopher Reeve, Morgan Freeman, Kathy Baker, and Mimi Rogers. Reeve portrays an ambitious reporter who fabricates an interview with a pimp. When a real pimp who closely matches the fictional description (Freeman) is indicted for murder, both he and the prosecutor try to exploit the reporter for their own ends.

The film was released to theatres by Cannon Films on March 20, 1987. Despite being well-received by audiences and critics, the film was a commercial failure. The performances of Freeman and Baker were highly praised, and Freeman considered his role as his film breakthrough. He was nominated for both an Academy Award and a Golden Globe Award, and won the Independent Spirit Award for Best Supporting Male for his performance.

== Plot ==
Jonathan Fisher, a struggling magazine reporter in New York City, is having difficulty pitching a story to his editor, Ted Avery. Frustrated and worried about his career prospects, he finally pitches a profile on a real-life street pimp, which Ted finds intriguing but gives him a very narrow deadline to meet. Jonathan pays a prostitute for her time, an upbeat former beautician nicknamed Punchy, but finds himself stonewalled by her fear-based loyalty to her pimp, Leo "Fast Black" Smalls, Jr. Across town, Smalls beats up a patron assaulting one of his girls; the patron has a fatal heart attack and Smalls is indicted for second-degree murder.

After an attempt by his girlfriend, Alison, to help him with his article goes disastrously wrong, Jonathan invents the story of a pimp named Tyrone. The story is exceptionally well-received by Ted and the magazine's readership; Jonathan is lured into TV stardom as a result, hosting a news segment called "Street Smart," about people using their "street smarts" on the streets of New York City. However, Jonathan soon comes under pressure from Ted, who is eager to meet "Tyrone" and publish more stories about him, and from an Assistant District Attorney named Leonard Pike, who visits Jonathan at home, angry that his story is granting Smalls' celebrity just when he is going before the court. Jon denies that Tyrone and Smalls are the same person, but Pike does not believe him, and even Smalls' own legal team believes that Smalls is the subject, so strong are the parallels. Smalls' lawyer subpoenas the notes of Jonathan's article, knowing that Ted, Jonathan and the magazine will refuse, and that their refusal to cooperate will imply to a jury that Smalls should be exonerated of the murder. Meanwhile, Smalls, Punchy, and Smalls' lieutenant, Reggie, start hanging around with Jonathan, even attending a magazine fundraiser in Ted's home as the guests of honor. Jonathan and Punchy have in the meantime become romantically involved, causing Alison to break up with Jonathan.

Despite his often charming exterior, Smalls is a violent and unpredictable man; he nearly cuts up the face of his favorite prostitute, Darlene, when he believes she is skimming from her earnings. Smalls, who knows that the magazine article isn't about him, asks Jonathan to create notes that show that their interview coincided with the time of the murder, therefore giving him an alibi. Jonathan is subpoenaed to appear at Smalls' trial and ordered to hand over said notes (which only Jonathan and Alison know for certain do not exist). Jonathan declines to comply, is found in contempt of court and summarily held in custody. Jonathan makes bail, and then admits to the magazine's lawyer representing him that he made up the entire story, that the similarities between the Tyrone character of the story and the circumstances of Smalls' life are purely coincidental and tries to back out, but the judge on the case shows him photos Pike had taken of Smalls and Jonathan eating together during their first public meeting, and is held in contempt and remanded into custody once again. Pike then approaches Punchy, who initially refuses to answer his questions and unsuccessfully tries to seduce him, but when she later tries to tell Smalls she wants to stop turning tricks for him, Smalls threatens to cut out her eye and he makes Punchy choose which eye he will take. After she tearfully chooses her left eye, Smalls relents and lets her go. Punchy runs straight back to Pike and tells him Smalls wants Jonathan to fabricate the aforementioned notes, but Smalls kills her shortly after she leaves Pike's apartment. Pike, having identified Punchy's body at the morgue, visits Jonathan in jail to inform him of her murder, and also tells him that he knows about what Smalls wants Jonathan to do, angrily advising him not to do it. Meanwhile, on Smalls' orders, Reggie stabs Alison as she goes shopping and puts her in the hospital.

Trapped and with nothing left to do, Jonathan changes his story again and declares that he will produce the notes and is released. He meets Smalls and agrees to give him the alibi he needs. Smalls is found not guilty, and a furious Pike tells Jonathan that he'll be pursuing him for fabricating evidence. When Jonathan asks what he would get out of that, Pike replies "satisfaction". Despite the criminal charges hanging over his head, Jonathan's journalistic reputation remains intact and he and Alison get back together. In revenge for Alison's stabbing, Jonathan entraps Reggie by videotaping him accepting $200 from Darlene (which was given to her by Jonathan who asked her to tell Reggie it came from Smalls), which makes it look as if Reggie is the one skimming from Smalls. Jonathan then warns a terrified Reggie that he should skip town before Jonathan shows the videotape to Smalls.

Smalls, unaware of the videotape, has been looking for the recently absent Reggie. He finally locates him, but Reggie, convinced that Smalls is coming to kill him, takes off running. As Smalls gives chase, Reggie trips and falls. Confused by Reggie's behavior, Smalls approaches, and Reggie, afraid for his life, shoots Smalls dead. As Reggie is taken away in handcuffs, Jonathan reports on Smalls' execution for his latest "Street Smart" segment.

== Cast ==
- Christopher Reeve as Jonathan Fisher
- Morgan Freeman as Leo "Fast Black" Smalls, Jr.
- Kathy Baker as Punchy
- Mimi Rogers as Alison Parker
- Andre Gregory as Ted Avery
- Jay Patterson as A.D.A. Leonard Pike
- Anna Maria Horsford as Harriet
- Erik King as Reggie
- Michael J. Reynolds as Art Sheffield
- Shari Hilton as Darlene
- Donna Bailey as Yvonne
- Ed Van Nuys as Judge
- Rick Aviles as Solo
- Les Carlson as Marty
- Terry Haig as Marshall
- Grace Garland as Prostitute

== Production ==
=== Development ===
Street Smart was a long-time pet project of Christopher Reeve, but he was having difficulty getting the film financed. When the Cannon Group acquired the rights to Superman IV: The Quest for Peace, Reeve agreed to do the film partly because Cannon promised to give Street Smart the financial backing it needed.

Screenwriter David Freeman based the script on his own life. While working for New York magazine in the late 1960's, he fabricated a story about a pimp, which was published in the May 1969 issue as "The Lifestyle of a Pimp". At the time, New York was still an upstart publication and lacked a full-time fact-checking department. Freeman was not caught at the time, and only disclosed his deception during an interview with the magazine promoting the film in March 1987, stating "I was trying to write fiction in the form of journalism."

The script, originally titled Streets of New York, was written in the 1970s. Sydney Pollack was originally attached to direct in the film in 1980.

=== Filming ===
Reeve and director Jerry Schatzberg, both native New Yorkers, originally intended to shoot the entire film on-location in New York City. Cannon mogul Menahem Golan insisted they film in Canada as a cost-cutting measure, consequently, Street Smart was labeled a runaway production.

Principal photography took place in Montreal, Quebec, along with two weeks of exterior location filming in New York City. The production chose Shaughnessy Village due to its similar style of architecture and layout to Upper Manhattan. Production designer Dan Leigh imported signage, paraphernalia, phone booths, mailboxes, and even garbage from Harlem in order to better mimic an American locale.

During filming in New York City, the production was picketed for allegedly using a non-union crew. Cannon officials agreed to hire a union crew for its next New York City shoot, and the strike was called off. Christopher Reeve, who was on the Council of Actors' Equity Association and a union supporter, was forced to cross the picket line due to a “no-strike clause” in his contract. The production was also picketed by a neighborhood group in Harlem, that protested the perceived racial stereotypes being used in the film. The producers met with the group to hear their issues and agreed to hire locals for day jobs on the set.

=== Music ===
The musical score was composed by jazz musician Robert Irving III, and performed by Irving and Miles Davis.

== Release ==
The film was released by Cannon in the United States on March 20, 1987.

== Reception ==
=== Box office ===
The film performed poorly at the box office, primarily attributed to Cannon Films' failure to properly market the theatrical release.

=== Critical response ===
The film gained generally positive reviews. It currently holds a 67% rating on Rotten Tomatoes, based on 15 reviews.

=== Awards and nominations ===
Morgan Freeman was nominated for an Academy Award for Best Supporting Actor and a Golden Globe Award for Best Supporting Actor for his role. Despite having appeared in The Electric Company during the 1970s, Freeman considered Fast Black to be his breakthrough role. He also considers the role to be his favorite Oscar-nominated performance.

For her performance, Kathy Baker received the National Society of Film Critics Award for Best Supporting Actress and an Independent Spirit Award for Best Supporting Female nomination.

Institution	Year	Category	Nominee	Result	Ref.
Academy Awards	1988	Best Supporting Actor	Morgan Freeman	Nominated	
Boston Society of Film Critics	1988	Best Supporting Actress	Kathy Baker	Won	
Film Independent Spirit Awards	1988	Best Supporting Male	Morgan Freeman	Won	
Film Independent Spirit Awards	1988	Best Supporting Female	Kathy Baker	Nominated	
Golden Globe Awards	1988	Best Supporting Actor – Motion Picture	Morgan Freeman	Nominated	
Los Angeles Film Critics Association	1987	Best Supporting Actor	Morgan Freeman	Won	
National Society of Film Critics	1988	Best Supporting Actor	Morgan Freeman	Won	
National Society of Film Critics	1988	Best Supporting Actress	Kathy Baker	Won	
New York Film Critics Circle	1987	Best Supporting Actor	Morgan Freeman	Won	
