= The Story of God with Morgan Freeman =

- Genre: Documentary
- Starring: Morgan Freeman
- Country of origin: United States
- Original language: English
- No. of seasons: 3
- No. of episodes: 15

Production
- Executive producers: Morgan Freeman; Lori McCreary; James Younger
- Running time: 42 minutes
- Production companies: National Geographic Channel; Revelations Entertainment

Original release
- Network: National Geographic Channel
- Release: April 3, 2016 – April 9, 2019

The Story of God with Morgan Freeman is an American television documentary series that premiered on the National Geographic Channel on April 3, 2016. The series features actor Morgan Freeman who explores various cultures and religions and their take on religion-related topics, particularly their belief in a God or a higher power. The second season began airing on January 16, 2017, and the third on March 5, 2019.

== Episodes ==
=== Series overview ===
Season	Episodes	Originally released	
Season	Episodes	First released	Last released
1	6	April 3, 2016	May 8, 2016
2	3	January 16, 2017	January 30, 2017
3	6	March 5, 2019	April 9, 2019

=== Season 1 (2016) ===
No. overall	No. in season	Title	Original release date
1	1	"Beyond Death"	April 3, 2016
2	2	"Apocalypse"	April 10, 2016
3	3	"Who Is God?"	April 17, 2016
4	4	"Creation"	April 24, 2016
5	5	"Why Does Evil Exist?"	May 1, 2016
6	6	"The Power of Miracles"	May 8, 2016

=== Season 2 (2017) ===
No. overall	No. in season	Title	Original release date
7	1	"The Chosen One"	January 16, 2017
8	2	"Heaven and Hell"	January 23, 2017
9	3	"Proof of God"	January 30, 2017

=== Season 3 (2019) ===
No. overall	No. in season	Title	Original release date
10	1	"Search for the Devil"	March 5, 2019
11	2	"Gods Among Us"	March 12, 2019
12	3	"Visions of God"	March 19, 2019
13	4	"Deadly Sins"	March 26, 2019
14	5	"Divine Secrets"	April 2, 2019
15	6	"Holy Laws"	April 9, 2019

== Home releases ==
Region 1
DVD title	Season(s)	Aspect ratio	Episode count	Total running time	Release date(s)
Season One	1	16:9	6	271 minutes	January 10, 2017
Season Two	2	16:9	3	180 minutes	April 11, 2017
Season Three	3	16:9	6	300 minutes	April 23, 2019
