= Our Universe (American TV series) =

2022 American documentary series

- Promotional poster
- Genre: Nature documentary
- Created by: Naomi Austin; Stephen Cooter; Alice Jones
- Narrated by: Morgan Freeman
- Country of origin: United States
- Original language: English
- No. of seasons: 1
- No. of episodes: 6

Production
- Producer: Andrew Cohen
- Running time: 41-46 minutes
- Production company: BBC Studios

Original release
- Network: Netflix
- Release: November 22, 2022

Our Universe is an American nature documentary series made for Netflix. The series is narrated by Morgan Freeman.

The series released on Netflix on November 22, 2022.

== Synopsis ==
Across six episodes, Our Universe reveals the crucial link between the history of the Universe and life on Earth. This documentary series explains six specific phenomena: starlight, the cosmic clock, the changing seasons , the elements , water , and the force of gravity . "By combining breathtaking footage of wild animals with stunning cosmic special effects, the series immerses viewers in a fascinating adventure that explores the interactions that connect the elements of our natural environment," announces Netflix. From the creation of the sun to the birth of a sea turtle, Our Universe uses groundbreaking animation techniques to depict the incredible celestial forces that gave birth to our solar system. The use of state-of-the-art cameras and computer-generated imagery allows viewers to observe some of Earth's most iconic animal species up close

== Cast ==
- Morgan Freeman (Narrator)

== Episodes ==
No.	Title	Original release date
1	"Chasing Starlight"	November 22, 2022
As the Sun creates energy in its core, a mother cheetah must face its heat and hunt for her cubs in the Serengeti plains at the peak of the dry season.
2	"The Cosmic Clock"	November 22, 2022
The passing of time in the universe through the eyes of a female chimpanzee who is about to give birth in Gabon.
3	"Turning Seasons"	November 22, 2022
When Theia collided with the Earth 4.4 billion years ago the impact created the seasons by giving a 23-degree tilt in Earth's axis, thus a mother Alaskan brown bear has to cope with the seasonal challenges.
4	"Elemental"	November 22, 2022
A female green sea turtle is searching for food: atoms created at the Big Bang and in the core of the stars that formed after it.
5	"Water World"	November 22, 2022
The journey of water through the universe from 4.5 billion years ago to modern day Botswana where a herd of African bush elephants is constantly on the move to find it during the dry season.
6	"Force of Attraction"	November 22, 2022
How gravity shaped everything in the universe, including the Sun, Earth, and Moon, and how a male and female king penguin in South Georgia will find each other in a colony of thousands.
