= Pantaleoni =

Pantaleoni is a surname of Italian extraction and may refer:

- Téa Leoni (born Elizabeth Téa Pantaleoni), American actress
- Helenka Pantaleoni, American silent film actress and humanitarian
- Hewitt Pantaleoni, American ethnomusicologist
- Maffeo Pantaleoni, Italian economist and politician
- Romilda Pantaleoni, Italian soprano

== See also ==
- Pantaleon (disambiguation)
