= Hewitt Pantaleoni =

American ethnomusicologist

Hewitt Pantaleoni (March 22, 1929 – October 17, 1988) was an American ethnomusicologist, best known for his work on African music.

Pantaleoni was born in New York, the son of Guido Pantaleoni Jr., born in Missouri to an Italian immigrant father, and Lucy Hewitt. His father was the nephew of Maffeo Pantaleoni and grandson of Diomede Pantaleoni, and his mother was the granddaughter of New York City mayor Abram Hewitt and the great-granddaughter of New York industrialist Peter Cooper.

Trained in musicology at Harvard University (AB and MAT in Music, 1953; MA in music, 1956), he completed his doctoral research on West African drumming in Ghana and received his Ph.D. from Wesleyan University (1972). His fieldwork was primarily collaborative, leading to such joint projects as Songs and Stories from Uganda, a book he created with the Uganda dance ethnographer Moses Serwadda.

Pantaleoni taught Western and non-Western music for more than 20 years at State University of New York at Oneonta, where the Hewitt Pantaleoni Memorial Concert Series continues to this day. The Mid-Atlantic Chapter for the Society of Ethnomusicology (MACSEM), of which Pantaleoni was one of the first members, awards the Hewitt Pantaleoni Prize each year to the student who delivers the best paper at the chapter's annual meeting.

Hewitt Pantaleoni's stepmother Helenka Adamowska-Pantaleoni helped found the U.S. Fund for UNICEF, and served as its president for 25 years. His niece is American actress Téa Leoni (born Pantaleoni).

== Selected publications ==
- Ladzekpo, S. Kobla, and Pantaleoni, Hewitt. "Takada Drumming." African Music Journal 4.4 (1970): 6-31.
- Pantaleoni, H., and Serwadda, M. "Drum notation tablature." African Music Journal 4.2 (1968): 47.
- Pantaleoni, Hewitt. "Music in Africa: A Respectful Knock." Musical America, 12 Dec. 1968.
- Pantaleoni, Hewitt. On the Nature of Music. (Welkin Books, 1985)
- Pantaleoni, Hewitt. "One of Densmore's Dakota rhythms reconsidered." Ethnomusicology 31.1 (1987): 35–55.
- Pantaleoni, Hewitt, and Pantaleoni, Timothy. "Sharing Music With Your Child." Mothering Magazine, 22 Mar. 1990. [Edited and published posthumously by Pantaleoni's son.]
- Pantaleoni, Hewitt. "Three principles of timing in Anlo dance drumming." African Music Journal 5.2 (1972): 50–63.
- Serwada, W. Moses, and Pantaleoni, Hewitt (ed.). Songs and Stories from Uganda. (Crowell, 1974)

== See also ==
- Ethnomusicology
- Music of Africa
- Music of Ghana
