= The Unnatural (The X-Files) =

- The X-Files episode
- The Alien Bounty Hunter dressed as a member of the Ku Klux Klan
- Episode no.: Season 6 Episode 19
- Directed by: David Duchovny
- Written by: David Duchovny
- Production code: 6ABX20
- Original air date: April 25, 1999
- Running time: 45 minutes

Guest appearances
- Daniel Duchovny as Piney; Fredric Lehne as young Arthur Dales; M. Emmet Walsh as Arthur Dales; Jesse L. Martin as Josh Exley; Walter T. Phelan, Jr. as Alien; Brian Thompson as Alien Bounty Hunter; Paul Willson as Ted

Episode chronology
← Previous "Milagro"	Next → "Three of a Kind"
- The X-Files season 6

"The Unnatural" is the 19th episode of the sixth season of the American science fiction television series The X-Files, which first aired on April 25, 1999, on the Fox network. Written and directed by lead actor David Duchovny, the episode is tangentially connected to the wider mythology of The X-Files, but narratively functions as a "Monster-of-the-Week" story. "The Unnatural" earned a Nielsen household rating of 10.1, and its first broadcast was watched by 16.88 million people. The episode received positive reviews from critics, and was well-liked by members of the cast and crew, including series creator Chris Carter and co-star Gillian Anderson.

The series centers on FBI special agents Fox Mulder (Duchovny) and Dana Scully (Anderson) who work on cases linked to the paranormal, called "X-Files". Mulder is a believer; although the skeptical Scully was initially assigned to debunk his work, the two have developed a deep friendship. In this episode, Arthur Dales (M. Emmet Walsh), the brother of a previously recurring retired FBI agent with the same name, tells Mulder the story of a black baseball player who played for the Roswell Grays in Roswell, New Mexico, in 1947 under the pseudonym "Josh Exley" (Jesse L. Martin). Exley was actually an alien with a love of baseball. Exley is later tracked down by the Alien Bounty Hunter (Brian Thompson) and executed for betraying his people.

Among other things, the episode was inspired by the history of baseball in Roswell, as well as the infamous 1947 Roswell Incident. Jesse Martin was offered the lead guest role as Exley after Duchovny noticed him in a production of the musical Rent and an episode of Ally McBeal. Originally, Darren McGavin reprised his role as Arthur Dales, but after he suffered a stroke, he was replaced by Walsh. Many of the outdoor baseball scenes were filmed at Jay Littleton Ballfield, an all-wood stadium located in Ontario, California. The episode has been critically examined for its use of literary motifs, its fairy tale-like structure, and its themes concerning racism and alienation.

== Plot ==
In 1947, a mixed group of black and white men play baseball in Roswell, New Mexico. A group of Ku Klux Klan (KKK) members arrive on horseback, seeking one of the players: Josh Exley (Jesse L. Martin), a talented black baseball player. Men from the team fight back against the KKK, and when the mask of the clan's leader is taken off, the leader is revealed to be an alien.

In 1999, FBI agents Fox Mulder (David Duchovny) and Dana Scully (Gillian Anderson) look through Roswell newspapers from the 1940s. Mulder spots an article showing a young Arthur Dales (Fredric Lehne)—the original investigator of the X-Files division—Josh Exley, and the shape-shifting Alien Bounty Hunter (Brian Thompson). Mulder seeks out Dales in Washington D.C. but instead, meets Dales's brother (M. Emmet Walsh), who is also named Arthur.

In flashback, Dales tells Mulder about first meeting Exley in 1947. Dales, a member of the Roswell Police Department, has been assigned to protect a hesitant Exley. Dales travels with Exley and his teammates on their bus, and one night sees that the sleeping Exley is reflected in a window as an alien. The next day, during a game, Exley is hit by a pitch and starts making utterances in a strange language before returning to his senses. Afterwards, Dales notices that a mysterious green ooze appeared where Exley's bleeding head had rested.

Dales decides to investigate Exley's hometown of Macon, Georgia, and discovers that a boy with Exley's name had vanished about five years previously. That night at the hotel, Dales hears noises from Exley's room and breaks in, only to find Exley in his alien form. Exley tells Dales that he was forbidden from intermingling with the human race but fell in love with the game of baseball and remained on Earth. Exley took the form of a black man and played in the Negro leagues to avoid attracting attention. When major league scouts appear at one game, Exley deliberately performs poorly.

The Alien Bounty Hunter, who has been pursuing the renegade alien, takes Exley's form and murders a scientist who is investigating the green ooze that Dales found. Dales warns Exley that he is now wanted by the police, and Exley goes into hiding. The narrative returns to the events at the start of the episode. The KKK leader is revealed as the Alien Bounty Hunter, who has arrived to assassinate Exley. The Bounty Hunter demands that Exley revert to his true form before he dies. Exley refuses and the Bounty Hunter kills him. However, Exley bleeds red, human blood.

== Production ==
=== Conception and writing ===
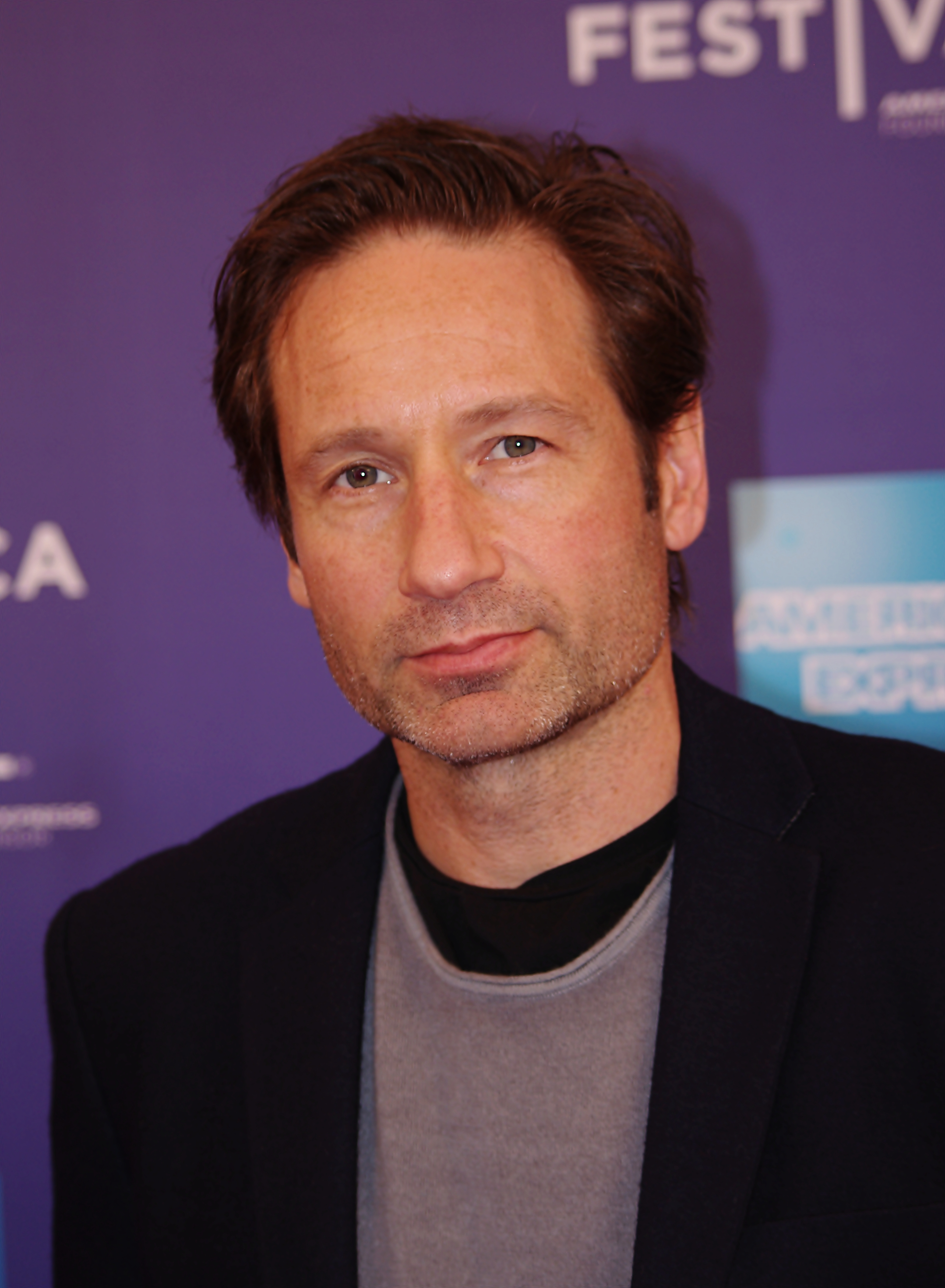
"The Unnatural" was written and directed by series co-star David Duchovny.

"The Unnatural" was the first episode of The X-Files that Duchovny wrote by himself. (He had previously co-developed the stories for the second season episodes "Colony" and "Anasazi", both with series creator Chris Carter, and received teleplay credits for the third season episodes "Avatar" and "Talitha Cumi".) Prior to the show's sixth season, Duchovny felt that he did not have the skills necessary; he said, "I didn't have the surety, the confidence in my mind, that I could write a teleplay ... It took me to the sixth year of the show to actually sit down and write one of my ideas." In late 1998, Duchovny eventually felt secure in his abilities and approached series creator Chris Carter about working on an episode; Carter agreed to the request, and a late-season installment was slated for Duchovny to write.

While both Duchovny and Carter had wanted to write an episode about baseball for several years, Duchovny first conceived the basic premise for "The Unnatural" during the home run race in 1998 between Mark McGwire and Sammy Sosa when he read a newspaper report about Joe Bauman. Bauman was a baseball player who, despite hitting a record 72 home runs during the 1954 season, never played in the Major Leagues. Duchovny immediately connected the story of Bauman, who played for the Roswell Rockets, with the 1947 Roswell Incident, saying "I just made the association ... What if this guy was an alien? and I just started working on that idea." Duchovny later said that "these happy chronological coincidences" facilitated the development of the story.

Inspired by the story of Jackie Robinson (who was the first black player who was accepted into the Major Leagues in the 1940s), Duchovny decided to make the lead character black and set the story before the integration of the baseball leagues. After Duchovny finished his first draft, Carter added additional plot points, such as the inclusion of the Alien Bounty Hunter and retired FBI agent Arthur Dales. Duchovny largely worked on his ideas alone—a fact that he was later very proud of. The episode title is a play on the novel and movie The Natural. The tagline that appears in the opening credits for this episode is "In the Big Inning", which serves as a pun on the phrase, "In the beginning". (Note: For the first eight seasons, the series' title sequence ends with a shot of a gloomy sky and lightning striking a mountain. During this scene, the show's tagline "The Truth Is Out There" usually flashes onto the screen. In certain episodes though, the line was changed; for this one it instead showed "In the Big Inning".)

=== Casting ===
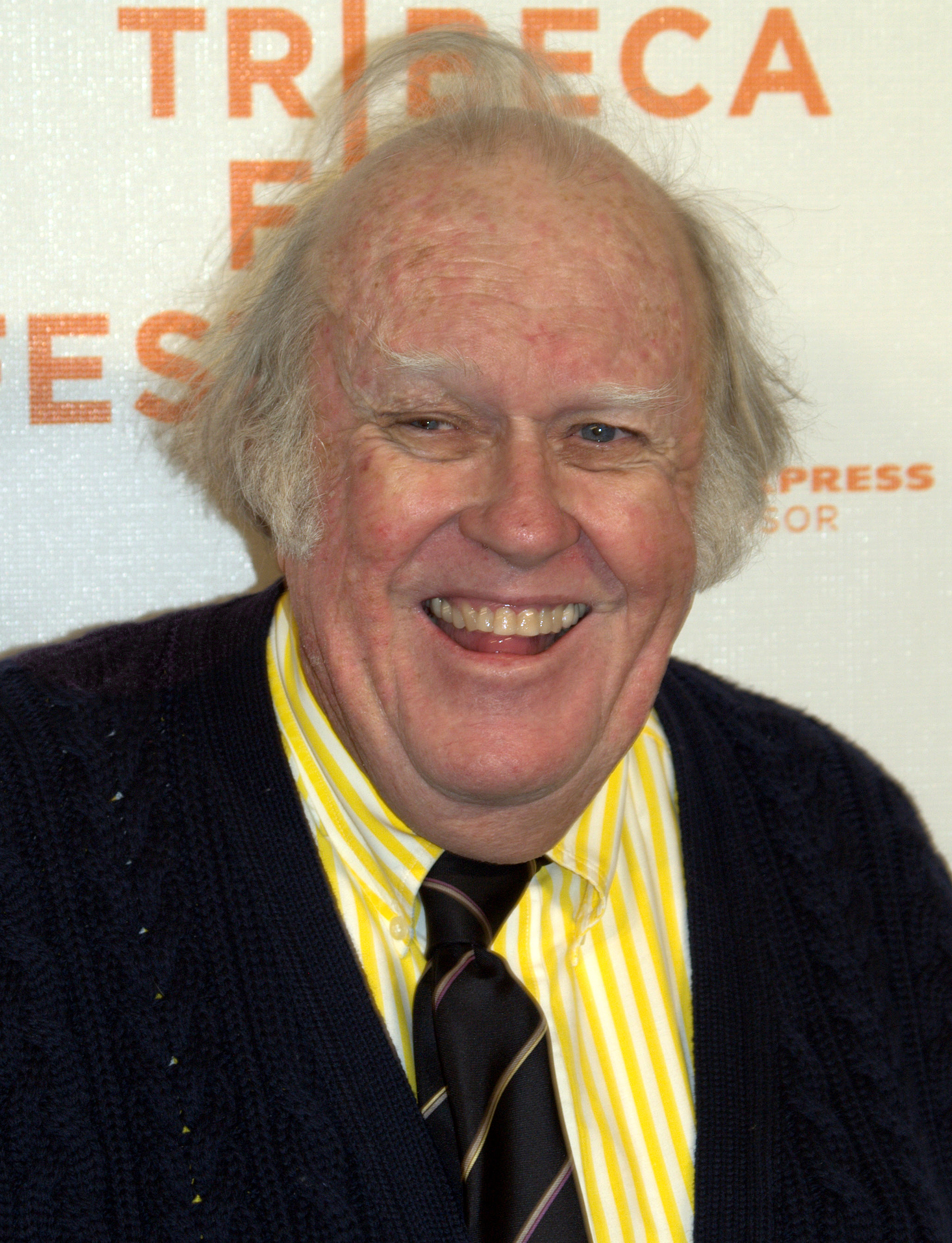
M. Emmet Walsh played the role of Arthur Dales after original actor Darren McGavin had a stroke.

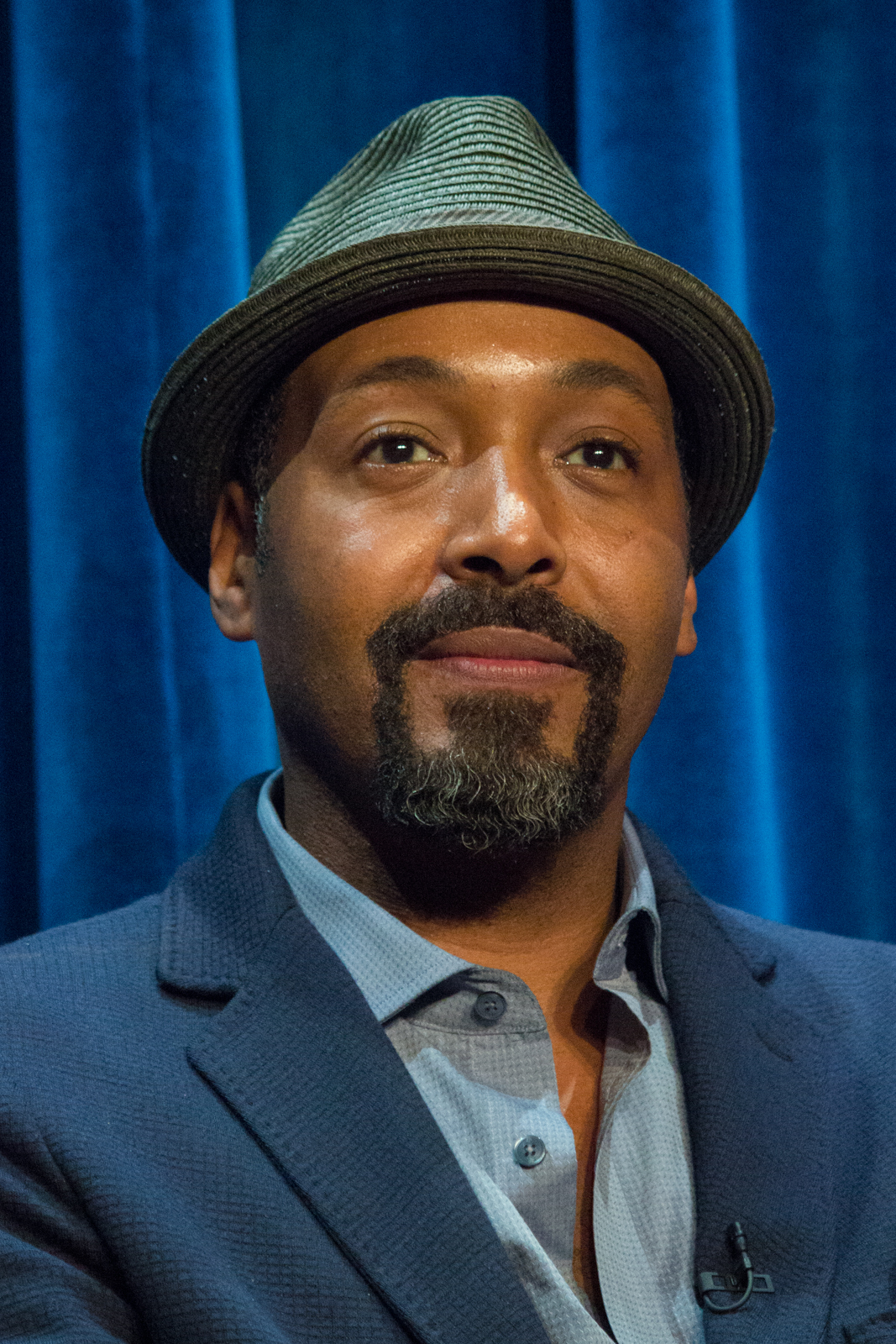
Jesse L. Martin as Exley.

Jesse L. Martin was the first actor considered for the part of Exley. Duchovny had first noticed Martin in a production of the musical Rent, and noticed him again during a guest appearance on the Fox legal comedy-drama Ally McBeal. Watching the latter performance, Duchovny decided that Martin had the "right feel" for the lead role. Duchovny later noted that he had little involvement with the casting process since a majority of the characters in the episode were recurring.

Originally, Darren McGavin was set to reprise his role as Arthur Dales; the character had previously appeared in the fifth-season episode "Travelers" and the sixth-season episode "Agua Mala". Unfortunately, two days into filming, McGavin suffered a stroke, forcing Duchovny and the producers to scrap the few scenes he had shot, rewrite the script to explain his absence, and replace his character with M. Emmet Walsh. Because many of the scenes featuring a younger Dales had already been shot, Duchovny was forced to give Walsh's character the same name as McGavin's character; this was justified in the episode as a quirk on behalf of the two brothers' parents. The two scenes that were filmed with McGavin included the sequence in which Mulder asks Dales whether all great baseball players are aliens, and a scene in which Mulder asks Dales why he joined the FBI. McGavin eventually recovered and allowed his scenes to be included on the sixth season DVD as bonus features. Executive producer Frank Spotnitz later called it a "great sorrow that" the show had to replace Darren McGavin because the series' producers were "huge fans" of his role in the 1972 film The Night Stalker and television series of the same name.

Actor Fredric Lehne had previously appeared in "Travelers," playing the younger version of McGavin's character. Since McGavin was written out of the episode, Lehne played the younger version of Walsh's character. Los Angeles Dodgers radio announcer Vin Scully (whose name served as the inspiration for Dana Scully's name) played the baseball announcer in this episode. The announcer was initially unable to appear owing to budgetary issues, but later agreed to record his part for free. Daniel Duchovny, David's brother, appeared in this episode in a minor role as a bench jockey.

=== Filming and post-production ===
"The Unnatural" was the first episode of the series to be directed by Duchovny, which had been decided when Duchovny was working on plot points with Carter. As the episode, made up mostly of flashbacks, did not heavily feature his character, Duchovny was able to focus on pre-production. This narratological method also gave Anderson a minor respite from her work. While Duchovny later expressed gratitude that "The Unnatural" enabled him to get a feel for directing, he also experienced severe anxiety during the production process because of the stress that helming an episode produced. However, when the episode was finished, Duchovny was pleased, calling the results "great." He later noted that his stress was largely uncalled for because the episode would have been made even "if [he] just showed up and drooled for 24 hours a day."

The first five seasons of the series were mainly filmed in Vancouver, British Columbia, but production of the show's sixth season was based in Los Angeles, California. Jay Littleton Ballfield, an all-wood stadium located in Ontario, California, was used as the setting for the Roswell Baseball Stadium. The show's producers advertised in local media for fans to attend the game dressed in period clothing. During filming, a raffle was held between takes, and signed copies of The X-Files' movie, soundtrack, and film poster were given away. The scene featuring Mulder teaching Scully how to play baseball was filmed at Cheviot Hills Park in Los Angeles. The park was later used in the eighth season episode "Three Words" and the ninth season episode "Lord of the Flies".

Costume designer Christine Peters crafted the episode's baseball uniforms after visiting Sports Robe, a Hollywood costume house. Dena Green from the hair department gave extras haircuts so that they would be in the style of the 1940s. Car coordinator Kelly Padovich secured the use of two 1947 model Flxible buses for the Roswell Grays on-bus scenes, as well as various other contemporary vehicles. Researcher Lee Smith worked with the Baseball Hall of Fame to ensure the accuracy of the statistics used in the episode. The props department developed from scratch the Peter Rosebud Bank that Dales shows Mulder; property master Tom Day later noted that it was "one of the most expensive props" of the season. The score for the episode, written by the series' composer Mark Snow, was recorded with the help of musicians Nick Kirgo and Tommy Morgan—a first for the series (which had previously relied solely on synthesizers for its soundtrack).

== Themes ==
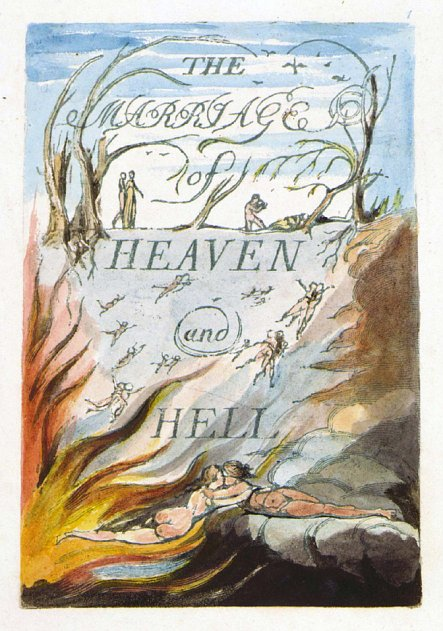
Mulder invokes one of William Blake's "Proverbs of Hell" from his 18th-century book The Marriage of Heaven and Hell in an argument with Scully.

Near the beginning of the episode, Mulder uses one of William Blake's "Proverbs of Hell" from his 18th century book The Marriage of Heaven and Hell in an argument with Scully: "The road to excess leads to the palace of wisdom." Sharon R. Yang, in her essay "Weaving and Unweaving the Story," writes that Mulder is invoking such high-culture literature from the Western canon to "justify his passionate dedication to questing for knowledge in arcane areas scorned by mainstream intellectual authority". In addition, Robert Shearman, in his book Wanting to Believe: A Critical Guide to The X-Files, Millennium & The Lone Gunmen, argued that the episode functions as a fairy tale, and that its conclusion, while sad, is nevertheless an example of a happy ending; Exley bleeds red blood as he lays dying, granting the alien his wish "to be a man."

Ideas of racism and segregation also permeate the episode. Sara Gwenllian-Jones in her book Cult Television argues that, throughout the entry, "the blacks are equated with aliens," turning them into a certain type of "other" that is "never allowed to fit in or feel safe". Gwenllian-Jones highlights the scene in which Dales, late one night on the team bus, wakes to see Exley's sleeping body being reflected as an alien in a window as an example of the racial comparison. She points out that, despite coming to Earth, Exley has moved from one segregated society—that of the aliens—into another. She points out that Exley, after revealing his true form to Dales, says that "my people guard their privacy zealously. They don't want our people to intermingle with your people". This quote expresses a similar sentiment to the segregated mentality of the 1940s.

== Broadcast and reception ==
=== Ratings ===
"The Unnatural" originally aired in the United States on the Fox network on April 25, 1999. In the U.S., the episode was watched by 16.88 million viewers, and ranked as the 17th most-watched episode of any series on network TV for the week ending April 25. It earned a Nielsen household rating of 10.1, with a 15 share. Nielsen ratings are audience measurement systems that determine the audience size and composition of television programming in the U.S. This means that roughly 10.1 percent of all television-equipped households, and 15 percent of households watching television, were watching the episode. On November 5, 2002, the episode was released on DVD as part of the complete sixth season.

=== Reviews ===
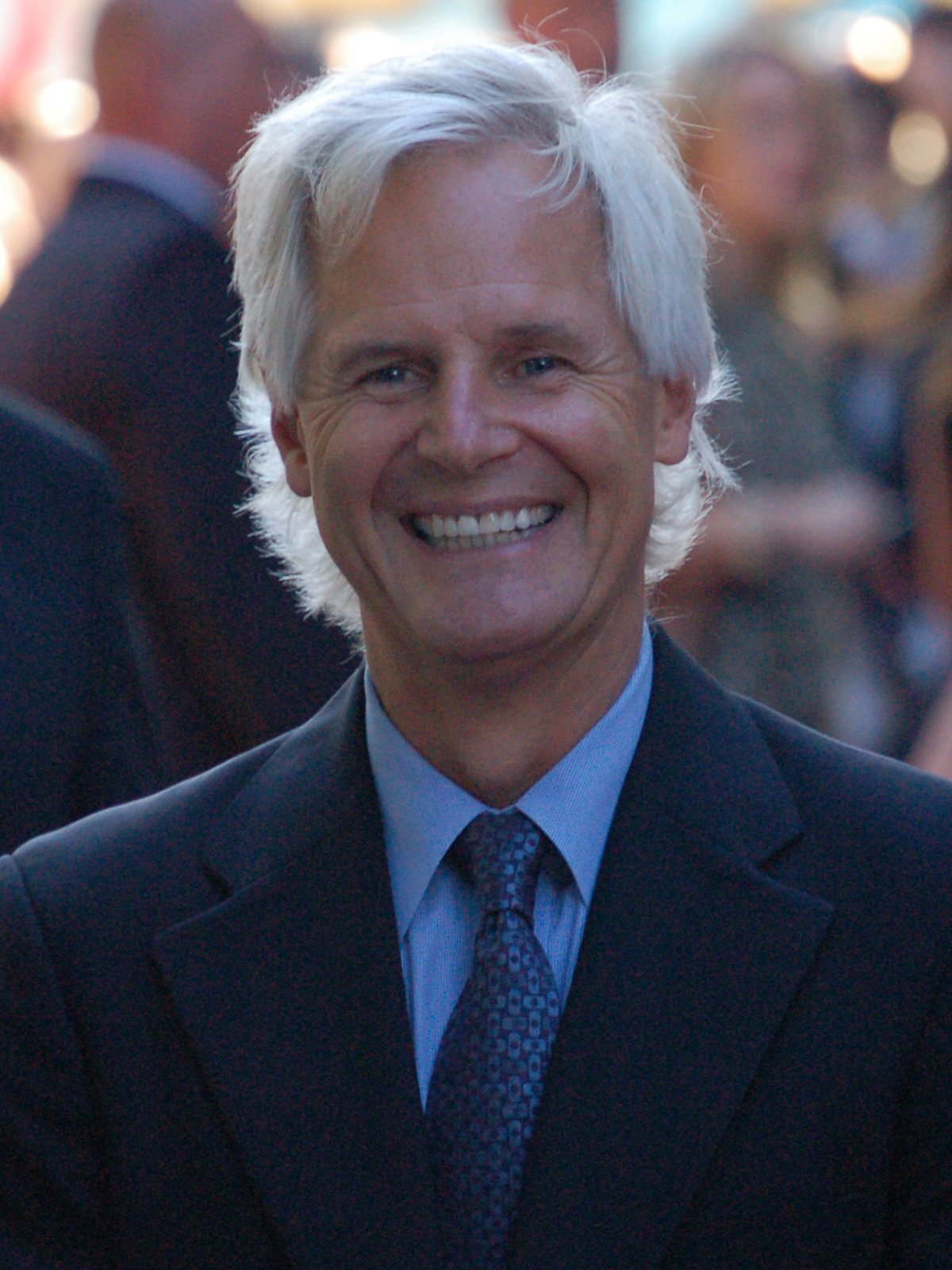
Series creator Chris Carter applauded the episode and called it "a very different kind of X-File"

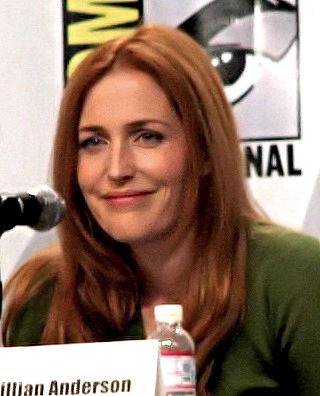
Gillian Anderson, series co-star, said she was "proud" of Duchovny's script.

The cast and crew of the show were complimentary towards the finished episode. Carter said, "I think that David, a person who has a very intimate understanding of the show, made the best of his opportunity to tell a very different kind of X-File, and expand the elastic show that it is." Anderson was also pleased, saying, "I was proud of David for writing the script. I thought it was wonderful. He was kind and gentle and respectful and humble, and always tried to do his best."

Initial reviews were positive. Eric Mink from the New York Daily News, in a pre-premiere review, said that it "ingeniously grafts classic X-Files story elements and wry, self-mocking wit onto a delightfully fresh premise". The Lexington Herald-Leader's review was mostly positive, complimenting the clever writing and noting that the "show was full of visual delights".

Paula Vitaris from Cinefantastique gave the episode a largely positive review, awarding it four stars out of four. Vitaris was complimentary towards the episode's exposition, and wrote, "above all, 'The Unnatural' is about the power of storytelling. We don't really know if Dales' story is true or if it's the liquor-fueled ramblings of a broken-down man, but in the end, this is irrelevant." Melissa Runstrom from Michigan Daily called it a "charming independent story," but that it "seems to say more about the human condition than about any extraterrestrial plot".

Recent reviews have also applauded the episode. Shearman awarded the episode five stars out of five, describing it as "[a] delightful ... comic fable". Emily St. James of The A.V. Club awarded the episode an "A−" and wrote that it "works because it takes this very silly idea and proceeds to take it seriously." She criticized the program for its "corniness" and its reliance on the "magical black guy" stereotype, but concluded that "The Unnatural" was successful "because it embraces this side of the show’s profile [that] could do something sweet and lovely and moving". St. James also complimented Martin's performance, calling his acting "terrific". Cynthia Fuchs from PopMatters wrote that Duchovny's directing debut was excellent.

Since its debut, the episode has been ranked as one of the best episodes of The X-Files. The Vancouver Sun listed "The Unnatural" on their list of the best standalone episodes of the show, and said that the story was heartbreaking. In addition, the closing scene featuring Mulder teaching Scully to play baseball was well received by critics. Shearman wrote that it "is especially delightful, and gives this sentimental episode an extra warm glow." Jean Helms of The Mobile Register named it one of the "Top 10 X-Files Clips We'd Like to See in the Official Video of Bree Sharp's 'David Duchovny'". Vitaris called the scene "one of the most charming finales in an X-Files episode" due to its "utterly endearing" qualities and its "unspoken subtext".

== See also ==
- "Hollywood A.D.", the second episode of The X-Files written and directed by Duchovny
- "William", the third episode written and directed by Duchovny
