= Amram Ducovny =

American dramatist

- Born: Amram Mayer Duchovny; September 11, 1927; Brooklyn, New York, U.S.
- Died: August 23, 2003 (aged 75); Paris, France
- Occupation: Writer
- Spouse(s): Margaret Ducovny (m. 1956, divorced) Varda Ducovny (m. 1972)
- Children: 3, including Daniel and David
- Relatives: West Duchovny (granddaughter); Téa Leoni (ex-daughter-in-law)
- Writing career
- Pen name: Amram Duchovny
- Period: c. 1964–2002 (as writer)
- Genre: Non-fiction

Amram "Ami" Mayer Ducovny (September 11, 1927 – August 23, 2003) was an American non-fiction writer, playwright, and novelist.

== Life and career ==
Ducovny, born as Duchovny, was born in New York City into an Ashkenazi Jewish family. He grew up on Coney Island. His father, Moshe Duchovny (1901–1960), who came to the United States in 1918 from Berdychiv, Ukrainian People's Republic (now in Ukraine), was a noted Yiddish writer and journalist, who wrote for the Morning Journal, among other publications. His mother, Hannah Julia Fiskoff (1906–1987), was an immigrant from Poland. Ducovny dropped the "h" in his last name to avoid its mispronunciations.

He graduated from New Utrecht High School and received a B.A. from New York University. First, he worked in public relations for the American Jewish Committee in New York, and until his retirement for the Combined Jewish Philanthropies of Boston. In 1977, he moved to Boston and became director of public affairs for Brandeis University. From 1978 to 1982, he was the vice president for public affairs at the university.

Around 1964, he started his writing career. He wrote ten nonfiction books and a play The Trial of Lee Harvey Oswald that was brought into Broadway in 1967, and was soon thereafter adapted for television. In 2001, Ducovny fulfilled his lifelong dream and published a novel, Coney, which received several positive reviews. It was based on his early experiences as the child of Jewish immigrants before World War II. In 2003, Ducovny died from heart disease in Paris, where he lived. He was 75 years old.

He had three children with his first wife, Margaret Miller: Daniel, actor and writer David, and Laurie. He was married to his second wife, Varda, from 1972 until his death in 2003.

== Bibliography ==
- Bobby Kennedy's New York (1964)
- How to Shoot a Jewish Western (1965)
- The establishment dictionary: From Agnew to Zsa Zsa (1966)
- The Trial of Lee Harvey Oswald (1967)
- The Billion Dollar Swindle: Frauds Against the Elderly (1969)
- The Wisdom of Spiro T. Agnew (1969) (with Peter Green)
- David Ben-Gurion, in his own words (1969)
- I'm in bed with the President, and Mao Tse Tung is knocking at the door (the American dream of an American girl) (1971)
- Catalog of fantastic things, americanized by Amram M. Ducovny (1971) (with Jacques Carelman)
- I Want to Make One Thing Perfectly Clear (1972)
- Coney (2001)
- Coney Island Kid (2002) (with Pierre Guglielmina)
