= Tadeusz Adamowski =

Polish-American ice hockey player

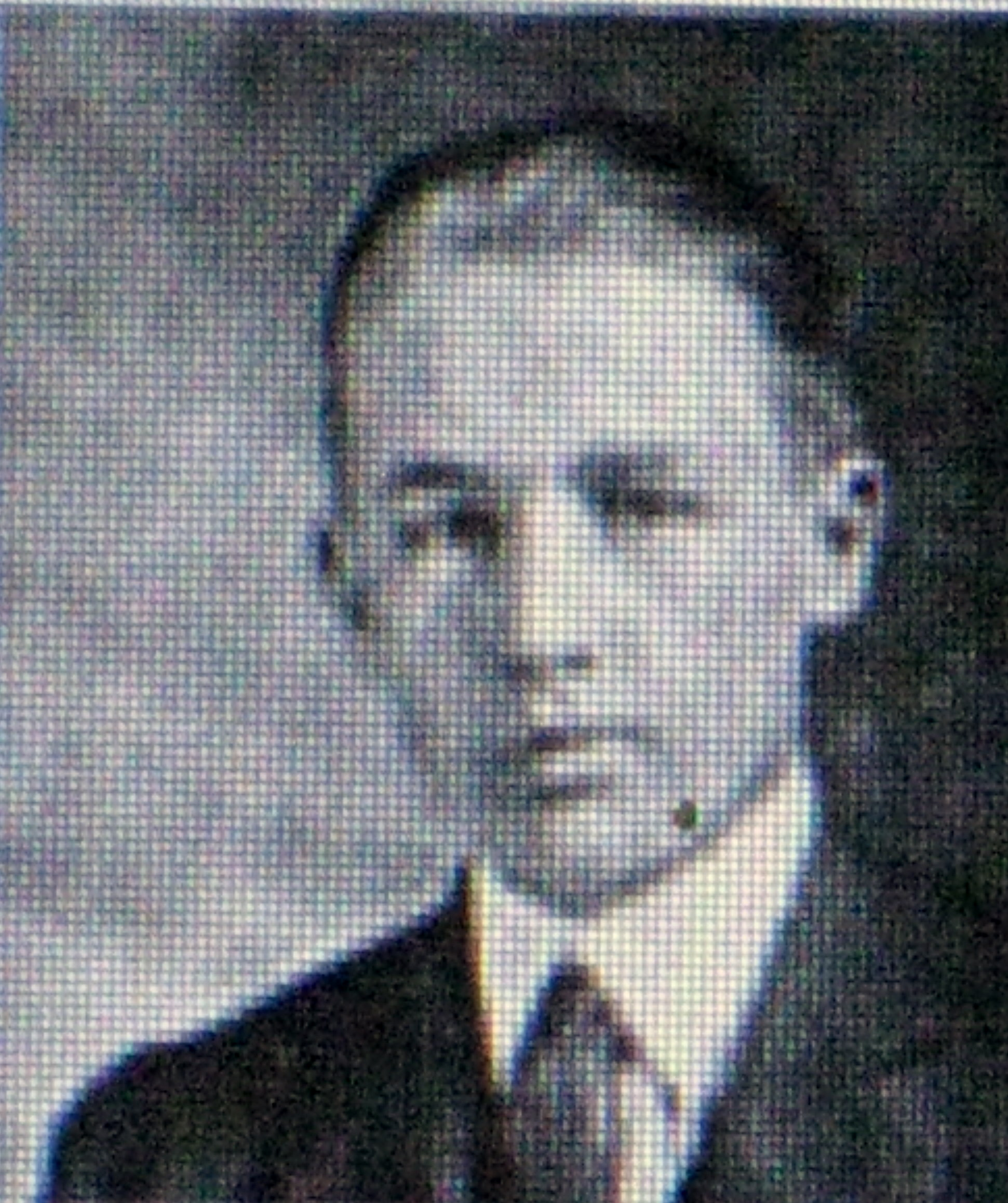
- Tadeusz Adamowski while at Harvard in 1919
- Born: November 19, 1901; Lausanne, Switzerland
- Died: August 22, 1994 (aged 92); New York City, New York, U.S.
- Height: 5 ft 10 in (178 cm)
- Weight: 154 lb (70 kg; 11 st 0 lb)
- Position: Centre
- National team: Poland
- Playing career: 1925–1939

Tadeusz "Ralf" Adamowski (November 19, 1901 – August 22, 1994) was a Polish-American ice hockey player who competed in the 1928 Winter Olympics, and a supporter and popularizer of the sport in early twentieth century Poland.

== Early life ==
He was the son of Polish musicians Józef and Antonina Adamowski née Szumowska, who with Józef’s brother Tymoteusz Adamowski made up the Adamowski Trio. He was the brother of Helenka Adamowska Pantaleoni, film and stage actress and humanitarian associated with the founding of UNICEF. He was also a cousin of the Polish pianist and diplomat Ignacy Paderewski.

Adamowski was born in Lausanne, Switzerland when his parents, Polish immigrants to the United States, had traveled there so that his mother could avoid being in the spotlight in her advanced pregnancy condition. His family resided in Brookline, Massachusetts, and were actively engaged in the music world in Boston but also traveled frequently to Europe. Adamowski graduated from the Browne and Nichols School in the class of 1918. He finished a degree in economics at Harvard (Cambridge, Massachusetts) in 1922. While in school he played American football, tennis, basketball and ice hockey. He was a member of the Harvard hockey team, and the college's fencing team.

== In Poland ==
In 1925 "he went to Warsaw as an agent for the General Motors Corporation". In Warsaw he ran into Polish hockey players, associated with the club AZS Warszawa, who asked him to join their team after he explained he had played hockey at Harvard. With Adamowski on the team, AZS Warszawa five times in a row won the Polish championship (1927, 1928, 1929, 1930 and 1931).

Between 1926 and 1931 he was the center of the Polish national team and considered one of the most technically skilled hockey players in Europe. He was chosen as the fourth most popular athlete in Poland in 1927 (and 7th in 1929).

In 1926 Adamowski took part in the European Hockey Championship in Davos, as part of the first-ever international appearance of the Polish ice hockey team. Adamowski played in the European Championships six times in all (1926, 1927, 1929-silver medal, 1930, 1931-silver medal, and 1933).

He participated in the World Championships three times (1930, 1931, and 1933). In 1928 Adamowski skated in the Olympic tournament, also with Poland's national hockey team. In 1930, during the World Championships in Davos was appointed to represent Europe at the game with Canada. One of his greatest hockey successes came in 1931 at the World Championship in Krynica, when the Polish team with Adamowski as its leader took fourth place, after Canada, the US, and Austria, making it the second team in Europe.

He became the coach of the Poland national team in 1927 and served until 1930, as well as in 1932. As a coach, he popularized Canadian hockey methods and strategy which stressed teamwork over individual players. Along with Aleksander Tupalski he also served as a coach for the Gdańsk club Gedania.

In the 1930s he worked initially for the group General Motors (delegation in Warsaw), and then in the enterprise "Gdynia-America shipping" S.A.

== During World War II ==
In 1939, during the Nazi invasion of Poland he was called up from the reserves into the Polish army and fought as a Second Lieutenant in the 21st Regiment of the 2nd Polish Corps, Vistula Uhlans (21 Pułk Ułanów Nadwiślańskich) near the towns of Bydgoszcz and Grudziądz. Captured by the Germans, he was imprisoned in Oflag II-C in Woldenberg (Dobiegniew). While in the camp he participated in educational activities for prisoners, organized classes for studying English, and played basketball on the camp team. At the end of the war, he managed to reach American troops stationed in Europe. He moved to the United States, where for many years he worked for UNICEF. He died in New York City in 1994.
