= Holy Cow (novel) =

2015 novel by David Duchovny

- Author: David Duchovny
- Illustrator: Natalya Balnova
- Language: English
- Genre: Fable
- Set in: New York, Istanbul, Jerusalem, Mumbai
- Publisher: Farrar, Straus and Giroux (US), Headline Publishing Group (UK)
- Publication date: 2015
- Publication place: United States
- Pages: 209
- ISBN: 9781472225917
- Website: MacMillan (US), Headline (UK)

Holy Cow: A Modern-Day Dairy Tale is the 2015 debut novel by American actor and author David Duchovny.

In the novel, a cow, a pig and a turkey escape their American farm to pursue a better life in India, Israel and Turkey, respectively. Duchovny initially pitched the story as a children's animated film, but it was rejected for its religious themes, including the pig being a convert to Judaism.

Critical reception was mixed, with distinct opinions on the novel's themes and style of humor.

== Background ==
Duchovny, best known for his role as Fox Mulder in The X-Files has a Bachelor of Arts degree in English literature from Princeton University and a Master of Arts degree from Yale University. He came up with the idea of Holy Cow when he thought that if he were a cow, he would want to live in India, if he were a pig he would move to Israel, and if he were a turkey he would want to live in Turkey. The story was first pitched as a children's animated film but was rejected due to its themes of Judaism and Islam, and scenes including the religious circumcision of a Jewish pig.

In July 2014, Duchovny told Rolling Stone that "It’s a kids’ book and an adult book. It's a fable, like Animal Farm or Charlotte’s Web; an allegorical story using animals for people".

== Plot ==
Elsie Bovary is a cow in Upstate New York who lives happily until one night when she sees footage of factory farming and animal slaughter on the farmhouse television. Another night, she sees a Discovery Channel documentary on India and wants to move to the Asian country, where cows are revered, not eaten. She finds common ground with Jerry, a pig who has converted to Judaism and taken the name Shalom, who wants to move to Israel where he will not be eaten. Tom is a turkey who is starving himself to avoid dying for Thanksgiving, and wants to move to Turkey, believing that they would never kill their namesake. He uses his beak to order flight tickets on a smartphone.

The three animals walk off into the city to find the airport, taking human clothing and walking on two legs. Shalom finds a mohel who can circumcise him to confirm his status as a Jew. Tom realizes that all three tickets were to the same destination, Istanbul, Turkey. When they get there, he steals a private aircraft to fly to Israel. He says that he will follow Elsie to India, as the name of the turkey bird in French and Turkish means "Indian".

The animals arrive in Israel and wish to guide Shalom to Jerusalem's Western Wall, but they get lost in Palestine before meeting disgraced former cigarette spokesman Joe Camel, who takes them to the wall. The Jews are disgusted by the sight of a pig at their holy site and chase the animals, throwing rocks, as do the Palestinians on the other side of the border wall. Joe Camel tells the Israelis and Palestinians that they should bond over their monotheism and hatred of pigs, which they do.

Returning to their aircraft, the animals make their way to Mumbai, where Elsie is doted on by even the poorest in society. She however cannot bond with the elitist native cows of India, who look down on other animals, including humans. Concluding that it is wrong to treat animals too badly or too favorably, Elsie tells the others to fly back to the United States. She writes a book about her experiences, while Joe Camel and Shalom are nominated for the Nobel Peace Prize for their work in the Middle East.

== Reception ==
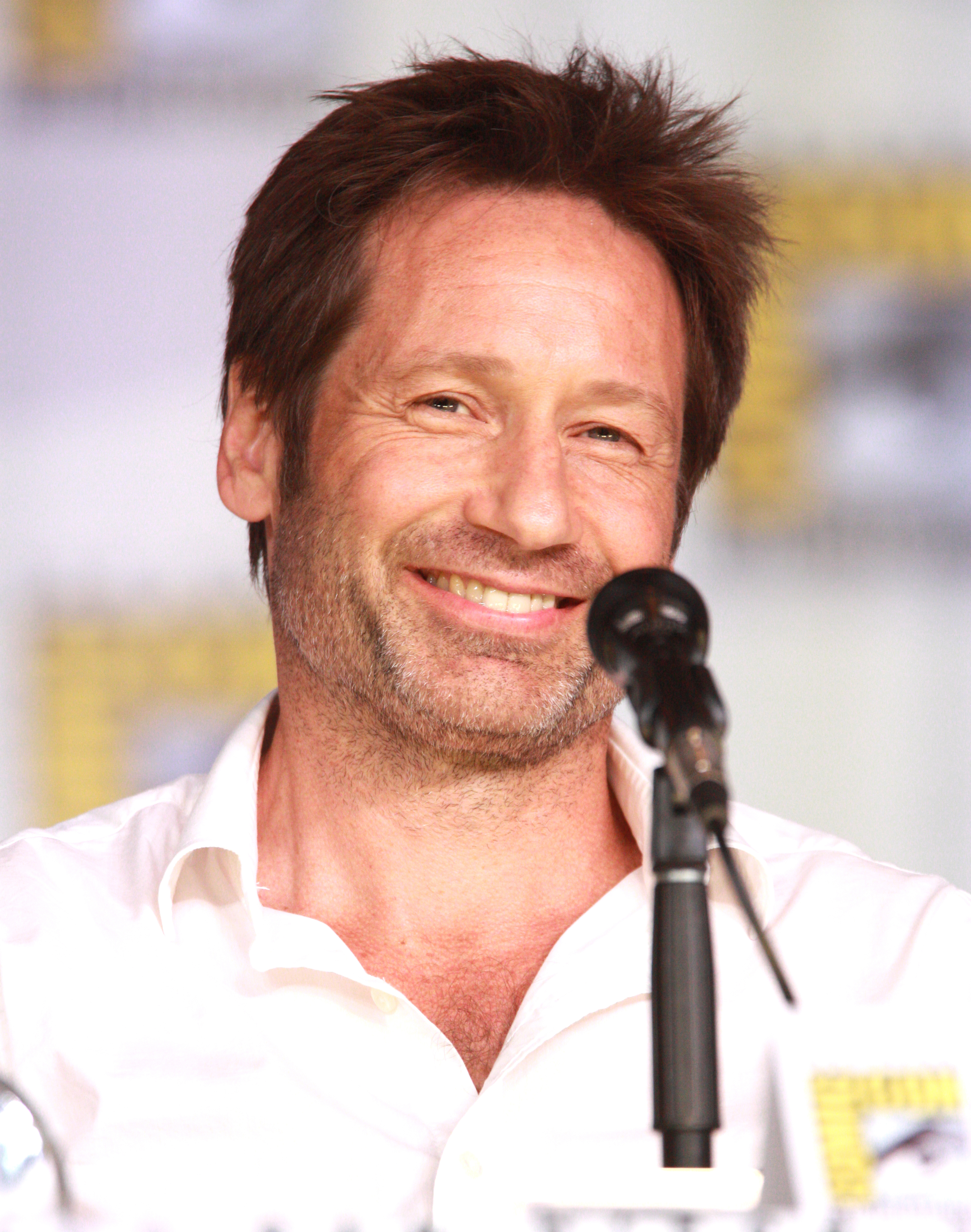
Some critics praised the unconventional tone and themes of David Duchovny's novel, while others were unsure what its target audience was

Matt Haig of The Guardian praised Duchovny for writing an unconventional novel compared to efforts by fellow actors James Franco and Ethan Hawke, and wrote that the book makes people reconsider their relationship with animals. He was unsure of the target audience, observing that "90% of the jokes would be lost on anyone under 14".

Shoshana Olidort of the Chicago Tribune noted that the novel seemed to be written like a screenplay, with casting instructions and product placement. She felt that much of the book's comments lacked nuance, including attacks on television, the medium that made its author famous.

A review in The Denver Post said that the book "doesn’t take itself too seriously" and is "charming", while touching on important issues. It likened the illustrations by Natalya Balnova to those of Gary Larson and Roz Chast. In Scotland's The Press and Journal, Andrew Brebner wrote "you need a good wit to get you through and Duchovny’s carries you through the preachy parts to deliver a fun and diverting tale". Sarju Kaul of The Deccan Chronicle in India praised "an easy and quick read" for its remarks on humans and farming.

Claire Fallon of HuffPost wrote that "the book seems to have no real idea who its audience is or what it’s actually about", being unsure if it was about vegetarianism, religion or Hollywood. A review for NPR by Michael Schaub was more critical, finding the book incoherent and "one of the most half-baked, phoned-in books I've ever read, and it's hard to look at it as anything but a vanity project".
