= Timothee Adamowski =

American classical composer (1858-1943)

- Tymoteusz Adamowski (Polish)
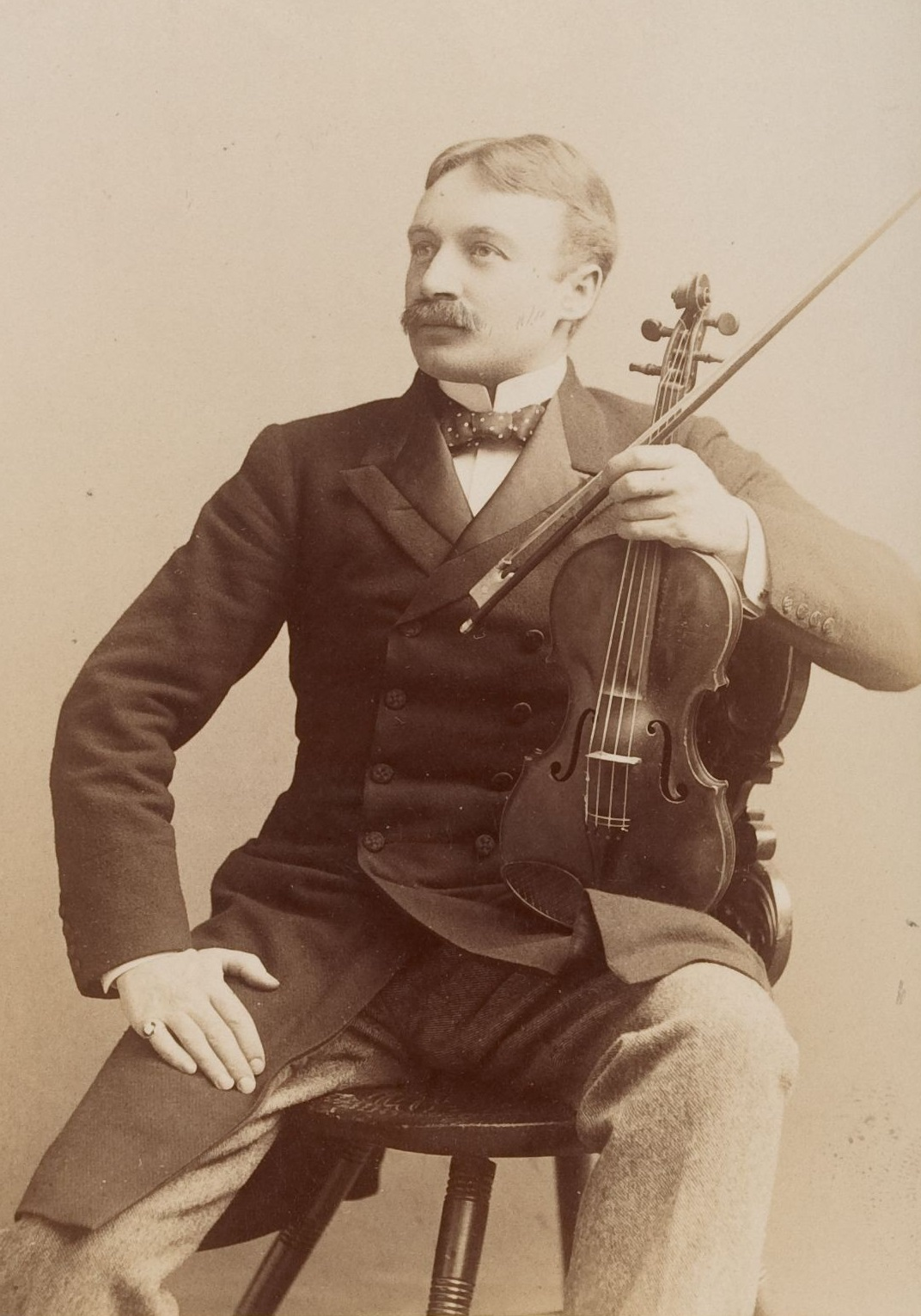
- Born: March 24, 1857; Warsaw, Congress Kingdom of Poland
- Died: April 18, 1943 (aged 85); Boston, Massachusetts, U.S.
- Burial place: West Laurel Hill Cemetery, Bala Cynwyd, Pennsylvania, U.S.
- Education: Warsaw Conservatory; Paris Conservatory
- Occupations: composer; conductor; teacher; violinist
- Spouse: Gertrude Lewis Pancoast
- Relatives: Antoinette Szumowska (sister-in-law); Tadeusz Adamowski (nephew); Helenka Pantaleoni (niece)

Tymoteusz "Timothee" Adamowski (March 24, 1858 – April 18, 1943) was a Polish-born American composer, conductor, music teacher, and violinist. He was a member of the Boston Symphony Orchestra from 1884 to 1886 and from 1889 to 1907. He formed the Adamowski String Quartet in 1888 and was conductor of the Boston Pops from 1890 to 1894 and from 1900 to 1907. He formed the Adamowski Trio in 1896 and was a faculty member of the New England Conservatory of Music from 1907 to 1933.

== Early life and education ==
Adamowski was born March 24, 1857, in Warsaw, Congress Kingdom of Poland. His father, Wincenty Adamowski, was an artist and music lover, who worked as a civil engineer and an administrator. Timothee began instruction in violin at the age of 7. He graduated from the Warsaw Conservatory in 1874 where he was a pupil of Apollinaire de Kontski, and completed his studies at the Paris Conservatory under Lambert Massart.

== Career ==
He made his first tour of the United States in 1879 where he performed with Maurice Strakosch, Clara Louise Kellogg, and Emma Cecilia Thursby. He also had his own group and played in a number of large cities. He was a violinist in the Boston Symphony Orchestra from 1884 to 1886 and again from 1889 to 1907.

In 1888, he organized the Adamowski String Quartet in Boston. Adamowski was first violinist, Emmanuel Fiedler was second violinist, Daniel Kuntz was violist, and Giuseppe Campanari was cellist. The quartet was reformed in 1890, with Arnold Moldauer, Max Zach, and Josef Adamowski replacing the other three artists.

In 1896, he founded the Adamowski Trio which consisted of Adamowski on violin, his brother Josef Adamowski on cello, and his sister-in-law Antoinette Szumowska on piano. They performed approximately thirty concerts a year. As a soloist, he performed in Paris at the Colonne Orchestra, in London at the Royal Philharmonic Society, and in Warsaw at the opera orchestra.

He was the conductor of the Boston Pops summer concerts from 1890 to 1894 and again from 1900 to 1907. He was referred to in newspaper accounts as the 'Idol of the Pops'.

He taught at the New England Conservatory of Music from 1885 until 1886, where his students included composer and violinist Elise Fellows White. He joined the faculty in 1907, and remained there until 1933. He published music including barcarolle, Polish dances, and violin pieces.

Timothee and his brother Josef were close friends with the Polish pianist Ignacy Jan Paderewski. They knew each other from their time as students at the Warsaw conservatory. Paderewski rented rooms in the Adamowski house when he traveled to the United States. The Adamowskis became involved in the Polish Victims' Relief Fund to provide support to Poles during World War I through their friendship with Paderewski.

== Personal life ==
Adamowski married Gertrude Lewis Pancoast. He died April 18, 1943, at the age of 86, in Boston, Massachusetts. He was interred at West Laurel Hill Cemetery in Bala Cynwyd, Pennsylvania.

Adamowski is the uncle of Polish Olympic hockey player Tadeusz Adamowski and the silent film actress and humanitarian Helenka Pantaleoni.
