= Helenka Pantaleoni =

American actress and humanitarian (1900–1987)

- Born: Helen Tradusa Adamowska; November 22, 1900; Brookline, Massachusetts, U.S.
- Died: January 5, 1987 (aged 86)
- Occupations: Humanitarian, actress
- Known for: Founder and Director U.S. Committee for UNICEF

Helen Tradusa "Helenka" Adamowska Pantaleoni (November 22, 1900 – January 5, 1987) was an American silent film actress and humanitarian. She was the founding director of the U.S. Committee for UNICEF, a role that she held for 25 years. Her granddaughter is American actress Téa Leoni.

== Family and career ==
Pantaleoni was the daughter of Polish musicians Józef (July 4, 1862 – May 8, 1930) and Antonina (née Szumowska) Adamowska (February 22, 1868, Lublin, Poland – August 16, 1938, Rumson, New Jersey). After studying piano in Poland Antonina became the only known female pupil of Ignacy Jan Paderewski in Paris between 1890 and 1895, when she left for the United States. Józef was a cellist and a member of the Boston Symphony Orchestra. Antonina, Józef, and Józef's brother Tymoteusz (a.k.a. Timothee), made up the Adamowski Trio.

After touring Europe and the United States her parents settled in Brookline, Massachusetts, where Helenka was born. She attended Miss Winsor's School in Boston. She studied dramatics and appeared in plays presented by the Junior League and the Vincent Club. "In 1917, on the occasion of Paderewski's presence in Boston in connection with aid for war victims, she appeared in a specially written play entitled "The Spirit of Poland," which was given at Jordan Hall in Boston. In the 1920s, she appeared in silent films as well as on Broadway. She subsequently became head of the Children's Theatre Department of the Junior League of New York.

She married Guido Pantaleoni, Jr., in 1935. Guido, a New York lawyer, was a widower with three children (Guido, Nina, and Hewitt). He was a graduate of Milton Academy, Harvard University and Harvard Law School. Guido was a nephew of Italian economist and politician Maffeo Pantaleoni. He and Helenka had two sons, Anthony and Michael. In 1935, Guido and C. Frank Reavis, Jr., founded the New York law firm Reavis & Pantaleoni.

Guido volunteered for service during World War II. As a Lieutenant Colonel attached to the Office of Strategic Services he was killed in action in Sicily in August 1943, leaving Helenka with five children to raise. Guido Pantaleoni died behind enemy lines while serving in the special forces. He is memorialized in the Sicily-Rome American Cemetery. Helenka Pantaleoni founded the Paderewski Fund for Polish Relief in 1941. She served the fundraising arm of the American Red Cross during World War II. After the war, she continued to serve in fundraising for the Polish Relief Commission.

Helenka helped to found the U.S. Fund for UNICEF in 1947, and served as the organization’s president from 1953 until her retirement in 1978. Her service as president of the U.S. Committee for UNICEF was unpaid. The Executive Director of UNICEF, James P. Grant, wrote in 1994:

For 26 years, from 1953 through 1978, she served as volunteer president of the U.S. Committee. While she headed the Committee more than $113 million was turned over to UNICEF in the name of the American people ...

== Honors ==
- 1966: Awarded an honorary Doctor of Laws degree from Wheaton College (Massachusetts).
- 1975: Awarded an honorary Doctor of Letters degree from Smith College.
- 2007: UNICEF inaugurated an annual Helenka Pantaleoni Award for humanitarian service.

== Personal information ==
Helenka's uncle Tymoteusz (a.k.a. Timothee) was the first conductor of the Boston Pops Orchestra. Her brother Tadeusz Adamowski played for Poland's National Hockey Team in the 1928 Olympics. Her stepson, Hewitt Pantaleoni, was an American professor and ethnomusicologist. Her son Anthony (father of actress Téa Leoni) is Chair of the Board of the U.S. Fund for UNICEF, and was of counsel to Fulbright & Jaworski (now (2020) Norton Rose Fulbright), the successor of the New York City law firm that his father founded in 1935. Her granddaughter Téa has served as a Goodwill ambassador for UNICEF since 2001 and is a member of the Board of Directors of the U.S. Fund for UNICEF.

== Filmography ==
Year	Film	Role	Notes
1923	Second Fiddle	Cragg’s Daughter	n/a
1924	Grit	Annie Hart	n/a

== Sources ==
- "Reminiscences of Helenka Pantaleoni," Columbia University Library, 1977. Item #CF/RAD/USAA/DB01/196-013. Interview by Richard Polsky, April 12, 1977.
- Helenka Adamowska Pantaleoni, In Her Own Words, New York: U.S. Committee for UNICEF, 1994.
- Jan Pirkey, A Gift from the Heart: Profile of Helenka Adamowska Pantaleoni, American Volunteer and Founding Spirit of UNICEF, Franktown, Colorado: JP Enterprises, 1986; ISBN 0-9617147-0-0.
