= Hell or Highwater (album) =

Studio album by David Duchovny
- Released: May 12, 2015
- Recorded: Q Division Studios in Somerville, Massachusetts
- Genres: Folk rock; alternative rock; alternative country
- Length: 54:27
- Label: Thinksay
- Producer: Colin Lee

David Duchovny chronology
Hell or Highwater (2015)	Every Third Thought (2018)

Hell or Highwater is the debut studio album by American singer-songwriter and actor David Duchovny. It was released on May 12, 2015, through Thinksay Records. Duchovny's backing band on the record, Weather, consists of Berklee-trained musicians. The album was produced by Weather member Colin Lee.

The album features a folk rock and alternative rock sound with elements from country music. Duchovny cited various rock and folk artists such as Leonard Cohen, Bob Dylan, Wilco, R.E.M., and the Flaming Lips as influences on the record.

== Background ==
David Duchovny began playing guitar only four years prior to the album. All of the songs were written in his apartment. He said that while most songwriters claim that lyrics are the hardest part of songwriting, coming up with the music was harder for him. Although the songs are not confessional or about anyone specific, Duchovny said that they are his life experiences and cited a Neil Simon quote; "Everything's autobiographical, even the stuff you make up." The song "Positively Madison Avenue" was inspired by a Super Bowl commercial featuring Bob Dylan and about the commercialism that his kids were being subjected to.

Having no singing experience, Duchovny took singing lessons from vocal coach Don Lawrence. The album was recorded in a week and a half at Q Division Studios in Somerville, Massachusetts with Berklee-trained musicians.

== Critical reception ==
Professional ratings
Review scores
Source	Rating
Consequence of Sound	C

Consequence of Sound's Dan Caffrey wrote: "You have to emulate before you can innovate, and as Duchovny continues to hone his musical chops, perhaps he'll transform the sounds of his heroes into something that’s distinctly his own." Jim Farber of New York Daily News described the record as "credible rock album" and noted that Duchovny's singing style was "sullen, inward, and broken, with a character redeemed by a dark charm." Farber also concluded: "In besting the grand majority of other actor/singers, he has done himself proud." Nevertheless, The Washington Times critic Eric Althoff criticized Duchovny's vocals, writing: "Overall, the disc is uneven; when it’s good, it achieves well, but Mr. Duchovny’s vocals prove to be his own worst liability."

== Track listing ==
All songs written by David Duchovny.

1. "Let It Rain" – 4:35
2. "3000" – 3:40
3. "Stars" – 2:58
4. "Hell or Highwater" – 5:46
5. "The Things" – 3:57
6. "The Rain Song" – 4:07
7. "Unsaid Undone" – 4:16
8. "Lately It's Always December" – 4:50
9. "Another Year" – 4:56
10. "Passenger" – 4:38
11. "When the Time Comes" – 3:39
12. "Positively Madison Avenue" – 6:57

== Personnel ==
- David Duchovny – vocals, guitar
- Produced by Colin Lee, performance
- Weather – performance
- Executive Producers: Brad Davidson and David Duchovny
- Recorded by Pat DiCenso at Q Division Studios, Somerville, MA
- Mixed by Matt Boynton
- Mastered by Joe Lambert
- Additional Recording by:
- Mitchell Stewart at Q Division Studios, Somerville, MA
- Jeff Fettig at The Creamery Studio, Brooklyn, NY
- Jacob Bergson at The Bunker Studio, Brooklyn, NY
- Editing by Mitchell Stewart and Pat McCusker
- String and Horn Arrangements by Colin Lee
