= Daniel Duchovny =

American TV and film director

- Born: Daniel Miller Duchovny; 1956 (age 69–70); New York City, U.S.
- Other names: Danny Ducovny; Daniel Ducovny
- Occupations: Actor, director
- Years active: 1980–present
- Father: Amram Ducovny
- Relatives: David Duchovny (brother); West Duchovny (niece); Téa Leoni (ex-sister-in-law)

Daniel Miller Duchovny (known as Danny Ducovny; also credited as Daniel Ducovny) is an actor and a director of commercials.

== Early life ==
Duchovny was born in New York City in 1956 and raised in Ukrainian Village, Manhattan. He is the son of Amram "Ami" Ducovny (1927–2003), a writer and publicist who worked for the American Jewish Committee, and Margaret "Meg" (née Miller), a school administrator and teacher. He is the first son and the oldest child of three children. He has a younger brother, David (b. 1960) and a younger sister, Laurie (b. 1966). Dan attended Downtown Community School (DCS) in lower Manhattan where his 5th grade teacher was poet Sonia Sanchez. Dan attended The McBurney School on west 63rd Street from 6th thru 8th grades. He played shooting guard on the 8th grade basketball squad which went 10-0. Dan attended Friends Seminary from 9th grade thru 12th grade. Duchovny's mother is a Scottish immigrant from Whitehills, Aberdeen, Scotland. His father was Jewish, and his mother was Lutheran. His father dropped the h in his last name to avoid the sort of mispronunciations he encountered while serving in the Army. In the Polish language, duchowny means 'clergyman', and in the Ukrainian language it means 'spiritual'. Duchovny's paternal grandfather was a Jewish emigrant from Berdychiv, Ukraine, and Duchovny's paternal grandmother was a Jewish emigrant from Congress Poland (now in Poland).

== Career ==
In 1990, he founded his production company, Cucoloris, with partner Linda Stewart. Before moving into directing commercials and the occasional TV series episode, he had worked on several movies in the camera department.

== Filmography ==
2024 - Schindler Space Architect co-cinematographer
2008 - "Going Down and Out in Beverly Hills" (Californication episode) — director
1999 - "The Unnatural" — guest appearance in this The X-Files episode, which was written and directed by his brother David
1994 - "You Make Me Want to Wear Dresses" (Red Shoe Diaries episode) — director
1988 - Vibes — New York director of photography
1987 - Tough Guys Don't Dance — additional photographer
1986 - Jumpin' Jack Flash — second unit director of photography
1983 - Lillian Gish — first assistant camera
1982 - The Weavers: Wasn't That a Time! — Cameraman
1980 - Missing Persons — director of photography
1980 - Fist of Fear, Touch of Death — camera operator
1980 - We Are the Guinea Pigs — assistant camera and second unit camera operator
