= Jacques Carelman =

French painter, illustrator and designer

- Born: 1929; Marseille, France
- Died: 28 March 2012 (aged 82–83); Argenteuil, France
- Known for: Painting

Jacques Carelman (born 1929, Marseille – 28 March 2012, Argenteuil) was a French painter, illustrator and designer.

== Biography ==
In 1966, Jacques Carelman adapted Raymond Queneau's novel Zazie in the Metro in bandes dessinées. He is also the undiscovered author of one of the most famous posters of May 1968 events in France showing a threatening CRS brandishing a truncheon.

Carelman is best known for his Catalog of fantastic things (Catalogue d'objets introuvables) also known as Catalogue of Unfindable Objects, made in 1969 as a parody of the catalog of the French mail order company Manufrance. This work has been translated into 19 languages (including Korean, Hebrew and Finnish). Among these imaginary objects are, for instance, a "Kangaroo gun" whose "barrel is extensively studied ... to give the bullet a sinusoidal trajectory which follows the animal in its leaps", or a disposable "Plaster anvil ... (sold by the dozen) to be discarded after use, allowing you to make substantial savings." The most famous item in this catalog was Carelman's "Coffeepot for Masochists", a coffeepot with a backwards facing spout that would scald the user. This design became a symbol for the critique of everyday things and was featured on the cover of Don Norman's book on the topic, The Design of Everyday Things.

Carelman had some of the objects of this catalog created and exhibited (from November 1974 to January 1975) in La Vieille Charité, Marseille. He designed in 1972 a catalog of unfindable postage-stamps ("Catalogue de timbres-poste introuvables")., portraying for instance la Semeuse, the sowing woman which symbolizes France on coins and stamps, swinging a tennis racket in her majestic gesture, or Papa Doc, the dictator of Haiti, as Père Ubu.

In recognition of the role played in the rebuilding of the OuPeinPo in 1980, Carelman bore the title of Régent of the Collège de Pataphysique, and was in charge of the chair of "Hélicologie", which purpose is to study the Gidouille, i.e. Père Ubu's belly, which is decorated with a spiral.

== Main publications ==
- Catalog of fantastic things, published 1971 by Ballantine Books in New York, americanized by Amram M. Ducovny, translated by Barbara and George Davidson from Catalogue d'objets introuvables et cependant indispensables aux personnes telles que acrobates, ajusteurs, amateurs d'art, alpinistes... Balland, Paris, 1969 - Livre de poche, 1975 - Le Cherche Midi, Paris, 1999, 2010.
- A Catalogue of Unfindable Objects, Objets Introuvables, published September 27, 1984 by Century Hutchinson.

Other works in French:

- Saroka la géante, tale, Le Terrain vague, 1965
- Zazie dans le métro, comic book based on Raymond Queneau's novel, Gallimard, 1966
- Petit supplément à l'Encyclopédie ou Dictionnaire raisonné des sciences, des arts et des métiers de Diderot et d'Alembert, recueil de planches sur quelques sciences, métiers et arts mécaniques du XXe siècle, avec leur explication, Balland, Paris, 1971
- Catalogue de timbres-poste introuvables, Balland, Paris, 1972 - Les éditions Cartouche, Paris, 2011
- La Peinture au quart de tour, Paris, Au crayon qui tue, 2000
