= Elise Fellows White =

American author, composer

- Born: Mary Elise Fellows; November 14, 1873; Skowhegan, Maine, U.S.
- Died: March 22, 1953 (aged 79); Skowhegan, Maine, U.S.
- Education: New England Conservatory of Music; Colby College
- Occupations: Violinist, composer, writer
- Known for: Violin performances and musical compositions
- Spouse: Bruce Miller White
- Children: 2

Mary Elise Fellows White (November 14, 1873 – March 22, 1953) was an American author, composer, and violinist who recorded for Schirmer records.

== Biography ==
Elise was born in Skowhegan, Maine, the only child of Frank and Deborah Swan Fellows. Her father played violin and was White's first violin teacher. When she was 10 years old, White and her mother moved to Boston so she could study at the New England Conservatory of Music with Timothee Adamowski, Campanari, Emery, L.C. Elson, and later Franz Kneisel. White continued her studies in Vienna with Kneisel's teacher Jacob Grun and with Max Lewinger. From 1887 to 1889 she attended Colby College, where she studied with Eugen Gruenberg.

White gave several recitals in Vienna while she studied there. Her debut in Boston was with the Cecilia Society under conductor Benjamin Johnson Lang, and in New York at a Bagby Concert at the Waldorf-Astoria Hotel. White was a violinist in the New York Women's Symphony Orchestra. During 1895 and 1896, she toured and played violin in the northern United States and southern Canada with the McKenzie Tour Company trio consisting of soprano Rebecca McKenzie, pianist Bertha O'Reilly, and White.

== Family ==
During this tour, White met her future husband, Bruce M. White, a mine owner and developer. They got married in 1898 and had two sons: Bruce Jr. in 1900, and James in 1907. The family lived in British Columbia until Elise moved back to Skowhegan with the two boys c. 1908. Bruce continued to support them financially until his death during the 1918 flu epidemic. After the boys grew up, White and her mother (as her father had died) lived in various places in Maine - Skowhegan, Boston, Topsham, Brunswick, and Portland - until her mother's death in 1934.

== Work ==
White supported herself by writing, playing violin, and teaching. In 1937, Schirmer Records recorded White playing seven pieces for violin and piano, accompanied by Carl Deis. She made additional recordings for Schirmer in 1942.

While living in New York, White worked for the American Association of University Women as a hostess at their 1939 World's Fair booth, and wrote articles for the Skowhegan Independent Reporter about the Fair. She also wrote the chapter "History of Music in Old Bloomfield" in Louise Colburn's book, Skowhegan on the Kennebec, as well as articles for various publications, including Chicago Music News; Music Quarterly; Musical Observer; New Music Review; and Violin World.

== Writing ==
White's articles include:

- College Jazz and What it Symbolizes (Musical Observer)
- Music Versus Materialism (Musical Quarterly 8; 1922)

White's poems include:

- Concert (Sonnet)
- Fifth Symphony (Sonnet)
- In Memoriam

White encountered several well-known people during her life, including Johannes Brahms while studying in Vienna during the 1890s. She wrote in her diary about seeing Charles Lindbergh in Old Orchard Beach, Maine, on July 25, 1927, only two months after his historic solo flight across the Atlantic. Artist Zaidee Lincoln Morrison, also a Skowhegan native, was one of White's closest friends. White corresponded with Australian composer Percy Grainger about American folk life and folk music.

In 1938, White wrote her autobiography, about which she said, "Let the record be, therefore, not one of joys and sorrows, though they have been intense enough in my life, but let this narrative deal with the surroundings and scenery of the journey rather than with the mishaps and worries of the traveler. Let it be a story of privileges and of opportunities –– not always made the most of, perhaps, but for which I am ever more grateful and more generously rewarded in a wealth of good memories."

== Musical Compositions ==
=== Chamber (violin and piano or organ) ===
- Angelus (1912)
- Bluebird (1914)
- Etude Caprice (1922)
- Fairy Tale
- Fantasia Esplanada
- Prelude in G (1923)

=== Vocal ===
- "A Sigh"
- "After Long Years"
- "As Rivers Seek the Sea"
- "For Remembrance" (with violin obbligato; 1910)
- "In the Silence"
- Madrigal (soprano, contralto, 30 female voices, piano and violin; 1927)
- "My Love is Come"
- "Out of the Night"
- "Sargent Industrial School Song" (text by anonymous)
- "Song of the Dawn" (text by Christina Georgina Rossetti)
- "Song of the Sea"
- "Song to Maine"
- "Spring Song" (with violin obbligato; text by E. F. White; 1916)
- "Twilight"

== See also ==
- A Maine Prodigy: The Life & Adventures of Elise Fellows White by Dr. Houghton M. White (published by the Maine Historical Society, 2011)
- Slideshow on Elise Fellows White
- Download Elise Fellow White's Public Domain Compositions
