= Saint X =

American TV series

- Genre: Psychological drama
- Based on: Saint X by Alexis Schaitkin
- Developed by: Leila Gerstein
- Starring: Alycia Debnam-Carey; Josh Bonzie; West Duchovny; Jayden Elijah; Michael Park; Betsy Brandt; Bre Francis; Kenlee Anaya Townsend
- Country of origin: United States
- Original language: English
- No. of seasons: 1
- No. of episodes: 8

Production
- Executive producers: Leila Gerstein; Alexis Schaitkin; Dee Rees; Stephen Williams; David Levine; Zack Hayden; Aubrey Drake Graham; Adel "Future" Nur; Jason Shrier; Steve Pearlman
- Running time: 42–51 minutes
- Production companies: Anonymous Content; DreamCrew Entertainment; ABC Signature

Original release
- Network: Hulu
- Release: April 26 – May 31, 2023

Saint X is an American psychological drama television series developed by Leila Gerstein, based on the novel of the same name by Alexis Schaitkin. It stars Alycia Debnam-Carey, Josh Bonzie, West Duchovny, Jayden Elijah, Bre Francis, Kenlee Anaya Townsend, Betsy Brandt, and Michael Park. The series premiered on Hulu on April 26, 2023.

== Premise ==
Based on the bestselling novel, this psychological drama follows the story of Emily Thomas on her dangerous mission to find out the truth about what happened to her older sister, Alison, who was brutally murdered and raped on an idyllic trip to the Caribbean 20 years earlier.

== Cast and characters ==
- Alycia Debnam-Carey as Claire Emily Thomas, an environmental documentary editor
- Josh Bonzie as Clive "Gogo" Richardson
- West Duchovny as Alison Thomas
- Jayden Elijah as Edwin
- Michael Park as Bill Thomas
- Betsy Brandt as Mia Thomas
- Bre Francis as Sara
- Kenlee Anaya Townsend as Claire Thomas (7 years old)
- Clarisse Albrecht as Deputy
- Sule Thelwell as Desmond

== Episodes ==
No.	Title	Directed by	Written by	Original release date
1	"A Lovely Nowhere"	Dee Rees	Leila Gerstein	April 26, 2023
2	"Woman Is Fickle"	Darren Grant	Leila Gerstein	April 26, 2023
More information about what went down during Alison's disappearance is revealed. Alison begins to explore her feelings for Edwin and Tyler. In present day, Emily begins to search deeper into her past for answers on Alison's death. Meanwhile, Edwin's tour of the Island Kay leads to a grizzly discovery.
3	"Men of Interest"	Darren Grant	Nina Braddock & Cynthia Adarkwa	April 26, 2023
4	"A Disquieting Emptiness"	Patricia Riggen	Jeff Augustin & Matthew Cruz	May 3, 2023
5	"Colonial Interference"	Patricia Riggen	Leila Gerstein & Natasha M. Hall	May 10, 2023
Tyler begins to push things further with Alison. In present day, Clive gets a surprising call from his past. Emily and Josh's relationship is put to the test as she continues to search for answers. Emily and Sunita begin clashing over her unhealthy obsession.
6	"Loose Threads of the Past"	Matt Sobel	Nina Braddock & Cynthia Adarkwa	May 17, 2023
7	"The Goat Witch and the Sinner"	Matt Sobel	Jeff Augustin & Matthew Cruz	May 24, 2023
8	"Faraway"	Ekwa Msangi	Leila Gerstein	May 31, 2023

== Production ==
=== Development ===
On January 24, 2022, Hulu gave production an eight-episode series order. It is based on the novel of the same name by Alexis Schaitkin. The series is developed by Leila Gerstein, who executive produced alongside Schaitkin, Dee Rees, Stephen Williams, David Levine, Zack Hayden, Aubrey Drake Graham, Adel "Future" Nur, Jason Shrier, and Steve Pearlman. Anonymous Content, DreamCrew Entertainment, and ABC Signature are the production companies involved with producing the series. Saint X was released on April 26, 2023, with the first three episodes available immediately and the rest debuting on a weekly basis.

=== Casting ===
On March 29, 2022, Victoria Pedretti was cast to star. In April 2022, Josh Bonzie, West Duchovny, and Jayden Elijah joined the main cast. On May 3, 2022, Alycia Debnam-Carey joined the cast in a recasting, replacing Pedretti. On October 27, 2022, Michael Park and Betsy Brandt were cast in starring roles. On January 12, 2023, upon the series premiere date announcement, it was reported that Bre Francis and Kenlee Anaya Townsend are also part of the main cast.

== Release ==
Saint X premiered on Hulu on April 26, 2023. It consists of eight episodes, which were released weekly until the finale on May 31. Internationally, the series was made available for streaming on Disney+.

== Reception ==
=== Viewership ===
TVision, which uses its TVision Power Score to evaluate CTV programming performance by factoring in viewership and engagement across over 1,000 apps and incorporating four key metrics—viewer attention time, total program time available for the season, program reach, and app reach—calculated that Saint X was the sixteenth most-streamed show from May 1–7. It later moved to nineteenth place from May 8–14.

=== Critical response ===
The review aggregator website Rotten Tomatoes reported a 19% approval rating with an average rating of 4.9/10, based on 16 critic reviews. The website's critics consensus reads, "A tedious crawl to an unsatisfying destination, Saint X only marks time instead of hitting the spot." Metacritic, which uses a weighted average, assigned a score of 51 out of 100 based on 10 critics, indicating "mixed or average reviews."

=== Accolades ===
Tony Mirza won Best Cinematography in a Dramatic Series at the 2024 Leo Awards.
