= Bucky F*cking Dent =

2016 book by David Duchovny

- Author: David Duchovny
- Language: English
- Genre: Fiction
- Publisher: Farrar, Straus and Giroux
- Publication date: 2016
- ISBN: 978-0-374-11042-0 (Hardcover)

Bucky F*cking Dent is a 2016 novel by actor David Duchovny which focuses on a father-son relationship and baseball.

== Plot ==
A Yankee Stadium peanut vendor moves in with his father, a lifelong Boston Red Sox fan, who is fighting off cancer long enough in hopes of seeing the Red Sox beat the Yankees in the 1978 playoffs.

== Reception ==
The novel received generally favorable reviews. Joseph Salvatore in The New York Times wrote, "Duchovny hits an unexpected home run." Micah Pollac, in The Washington Post, noted, "Duchovny's tone makes the ride a pleasure. He dips into the waters of love, death, fatherhood, marriage and sex, but he doesn't go too deep. You enjoy the swim without becoming a prune."

== Film adaptation ==
A film adaptation titled Reverse the Curse was written and directed by David Duchovny, with Duchovny starring as the father, Marty. The cast includes Logan Marshall-Green, Stephanie Beatriz, Evan Handler, Pamela Adlon, Jason Beghe, and Daphne Rubin-Vega.

The film had its world premiere at the 2023 Tribeca Festival and was released in the United States on June 14, 2024, by Vertical. It also screened at the 2023 Austin Film Festival, the 2023 Fantasporto International Film Festival, where it received the Directors' Week Best Film Award, and the 2023 Capri Hollywood International Film Festival, where it won the Capri Special Award for Best Feature Film.
