= Antoinette Szumowska =

Polish pianist (1868–1938)

- Antonina Szumowska (Polish)
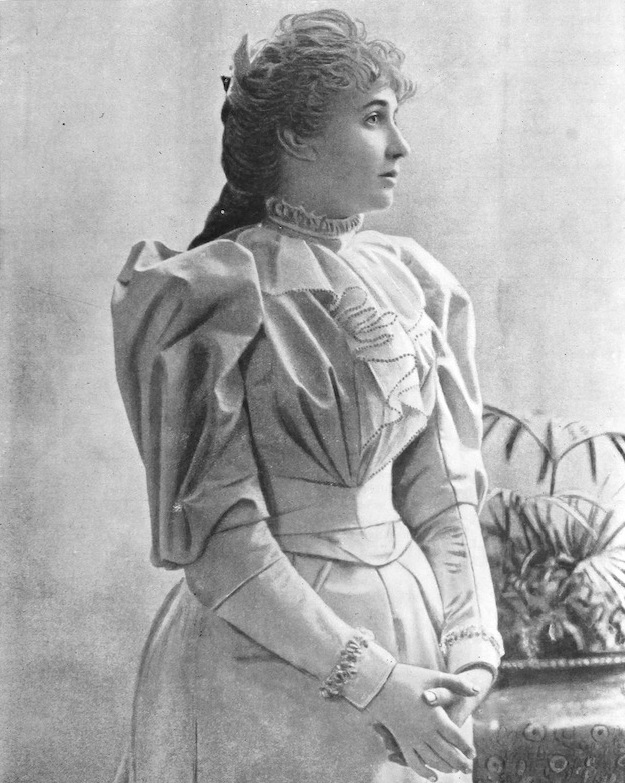
- Szumowska in 1895
- Born: Antonina Szumowska; February 22, 1868; Lublin, Congress Kingdom of Poland
- Died: August 16, 1938 (aged 70); Rumson, New Jersey
- Other names: Antoinette Szumowska-Adamowska
- Occupations: Pianist; piano teacher
- Spouse: Jozef Adamowski (m. 1896; died 1930)
- Relatives: Helenka Pantaleoni (daughter); Tadeusz Adamowski (son); Timothee Adamowski (brother-in-law); Téa Leoni (great-granddaughter)
- Awards: Order of Polonia Restituta Officer's Cross

Antoinette Szumowska (February 22, 1868 — August 16, 1938), originally Antonina Szumowska, later Antoinette Szumowska-Adamowska, was a Polish pianist and piano teacher.

== Early life ==
Antonina Szumowska was born February 22, 1868, in Lublin, Congress Kingdom of Poland. Her father, a professor, had been a political exile in Siberia. She was educated in Warsaw. After college, she studied piano at a conservatory in Warsaw, with Rudolf Strobl and Aleksander Michałowski. Szumowska moved to Paris in 1890, where she used the French form of her first name ("Antoinette"), and studied with Ignacy Jan Paderewski for five years:

My lessons with Paderewski were somewhat irregular. We worked together whenever he came to Paris. Sometimes I did not see him for several months, and then he would be in Paris for a number of weeks; at such seasons we worked together very often.

She was the only female pupil that Paderewski ever had.

== Career ==
Szumowska made her debut in Paris in 1891, and in London the following year. She performed on a tour of Great Britain in 1893. In 1895 she made her first trip to the United States, where she played in Boston and at Madison Square Garden in New York City, and at the inaugural concert in Steinway Hall in Chicago. Szumowska gave special concerts and wrote "An Appreciation of Chopin" for The Etude magazine, on the occasion of the Polish composer's centennial in 1910. She was a member of the Adamowski Trio with her husband and his brother, Timothee Adamowski.

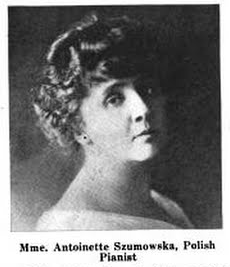
Antoinette Szumowska, from a 1921 publication

During and after World War I, Szumowska was president of the New England branch of the Friends of Poland, a relief organization. She raised money and went to Warsaw in 1920 to coordinate distribution of food and clothing. For her contributions she was awarded the Officer's Cross of the Order of Polonia Restituta, in 1924, a decoration presented by her former teacher Paderewski. In 1921 she resumed her performing career, with a concert in Boston. "Mme. Szumowska has lost none of her technical skill," an American magazine noted: "Her runs are rippling and smooth, her trill is hardly to be equalled, and her masterful playing in general was a welcome revelation to the audience."

Szumowska taught at the New England Conservatory of Music. Among her students were Jesús María Sanromá and Dai Buell.

== Personal life ==
Antoinette Szumowska married cellist Josef Adamowski in 1896. They had two children, Helene (Helenka) and Thaddeus (Tadeusz). They lived in Massachusetts and had a summer home on Sutton Island in Maine. She was widowed in 1930, and died August 16, 1938, in Rumson, New Jersey, at the age of 70.

Her daughter, Helene Adamowska, became an actress and humanitarian under the name Helenka Pantaleoni. Her son, Tadeusz Adamowski, became an athlete at Harvard University and afterward played ice hockey for Poland in the 1928 Winter Olympics, before serving in the Polish army during World War II. Both children were active on behalf of UNICEF later in their lives. Actress Téa Leoni is the great-granddaughter of Antoinette Szumowska.
