= West Duchovny =

American actress (born 1999)

- Born: Madelaine West Duchovny; April 24, 1999 (age 27)
- Occupation: Actress
- Years active: 2009-present
- Parents: David Duchovny (father); Téa Leoni (mother)
- Relatives: Daniel Duchovny (uncle)

External image
- Duchovny in 2023.

Madelaine West Duchovny (known professionally as 'West Duchovny' ) (born April 24, 1999) is an American actress. She is best known for the film A Mouthful of Air, the SyFy series The Magicians, the Netflix series Painkiller, and the Hulu series Saint X.

== Early life ==
Duchovny is the daughter of actors David Duchovny and Téa Leoni and has a younger brother. Her paternal uncle is actor and director Daniel Duchovny. After living her first ten years in Los Angeles, she moved with her family to New York City. Duchovny had no interest in acting and planned to study pre-medical before her senior year of high school, when she performed in a staging of Slut: The Play to help a friend who was directing, and liked the experience.

== Filmography ==
=== Film ===
Year	Title	Role	Notes
2019	The Report	Feinstein Intern	
2021	A Mouthful of Air	Cream	
2022	Linoleum	Darcy	

=== Television ===
Year	Title	Role	Notes
2018	Sick	Jonni	TV movie
2018	The X-Files	Maddy	S11E10: "My Struggle IV"
2019	The Magicians	Whitley	S4E3: "The Bad News Bear"; S4E6: "A Timeline and Places"; S4E7: "The Side Effect"
2020	Vegas High	Paige	TV movie
2023	Saint X	Alison	Main cast
2023	Painkiller	Shannon Schaeffer	Main cast
2026	The Five-Star Weekend	Aubrey	Recurring role
