= David Duchovny =

American actor (born 1960)

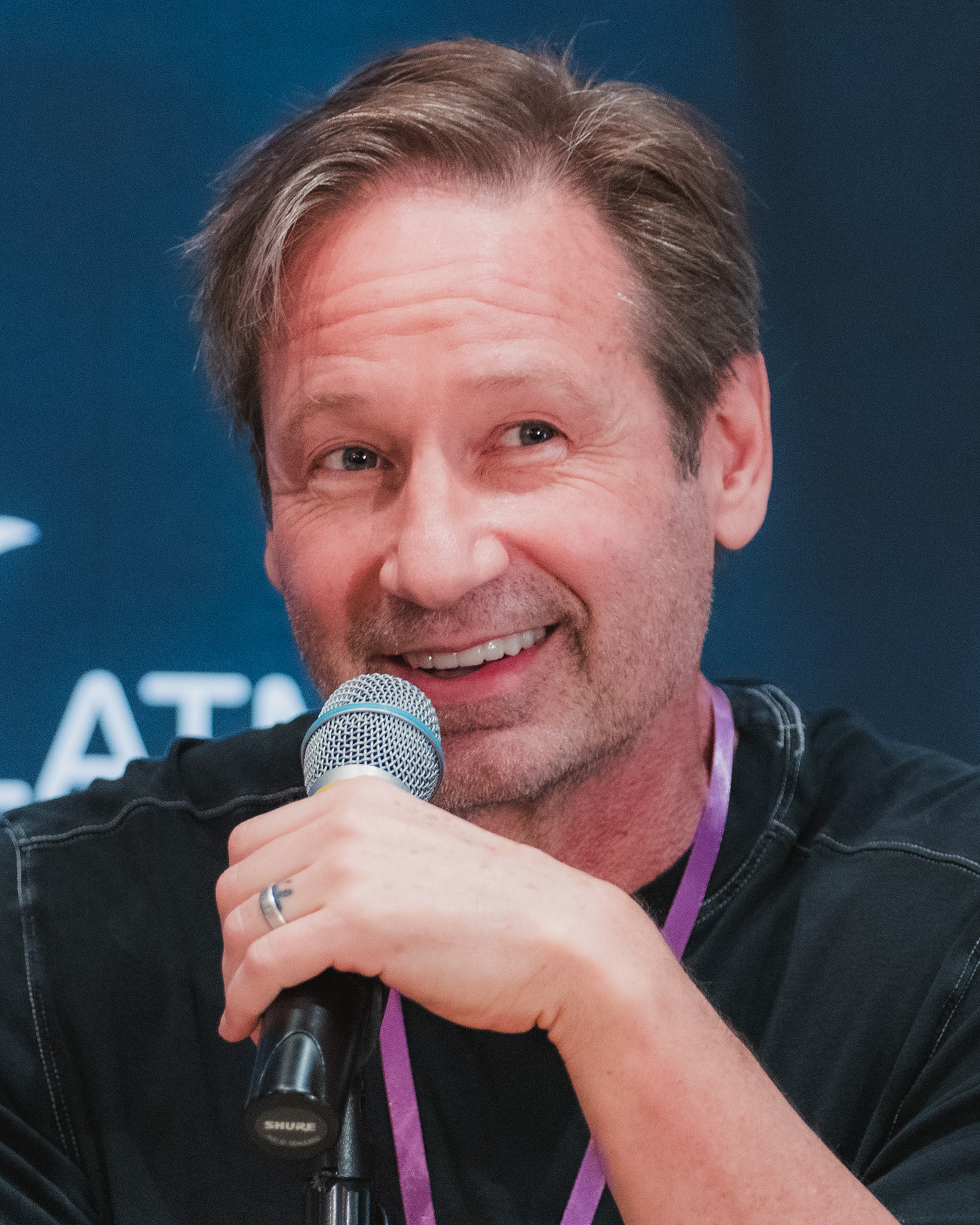
- Duchovny in 2026
- Born: David William Ducovny; August 7, 1960 (age 66); New York City, U.S.
- Education: Princeton University (BA); Yale University (MA)
- Occupations: Actor; writer; director; singer-songwriter
- Years active: 1987–present
- Known for: Fox Mulder in The X-Files; Hank Moody in Californication
- Spouse(s): Téa Leoni (m. 1997; div. 2014) Monique Pendleberry (m. 2025)
- Children: 2, including West Duchovny
- Father: Amram Ducovny
- Relatives: Daniel Duchovny (brother)
- Website: davidduchovny.com

David William Duchovny (/dʊˈkɒvni/ duu-KOV-nee; born August 7, 1960) is an American actor, writer, director and musician. He received his breakthrough with the role of Fox Mulder in The X-Files franchise (1993–2002, 2016–2018) receiving international fame and earning a Golden Globe Award as well as nominations for two Primetime Emmy Awards and five Actor Awards.

He received another Golden Globe for his portrayal of Hank Moody on the television series Californication (2007–2014). He also had a recurring role in the Twin Peaks franchise (1990–1991, 2017) as transgender DEA agent Denise Bryson. He executive-produced and starred in the historically based cop drama Aquarius (2015–2016). He wrote, directed and starred in the 2004 coming-of-age comedy House of D, which also starred Robin Williams, Téa Leoni and Anton Yelchin.

His film work includes a starring role alongside Brad Pitt in Kalifornia (1993) and minor roles in the coming-of-age black comedy Don't Tell Mom the Babysitter's Dead (1991), and the family comedy Beethoven (1992). In 1992, he also played Roland Totheroh in the biographical comedy-drama Chaplin with Robert Downey Jr. In the 2000s, he starred in Return to Me with Minnie Driver (2000), Evolution with Orlando Jones (2001), Connie and Carla with Nia Vardalos (2004), and The Joneses with Demi Moore (2009).

Duchovny holds a B.A. in English literature from Princeton University, and an M.A. in English literature from Yale University, and has published five books: Holy Cow: A Modern-Day Dairy Tale (2015), Bucky F*cking Dent (2016), Miss Subways (2018), Truly Like Lightning (2021), and The Reservoir (2022).

== Early life and education ==
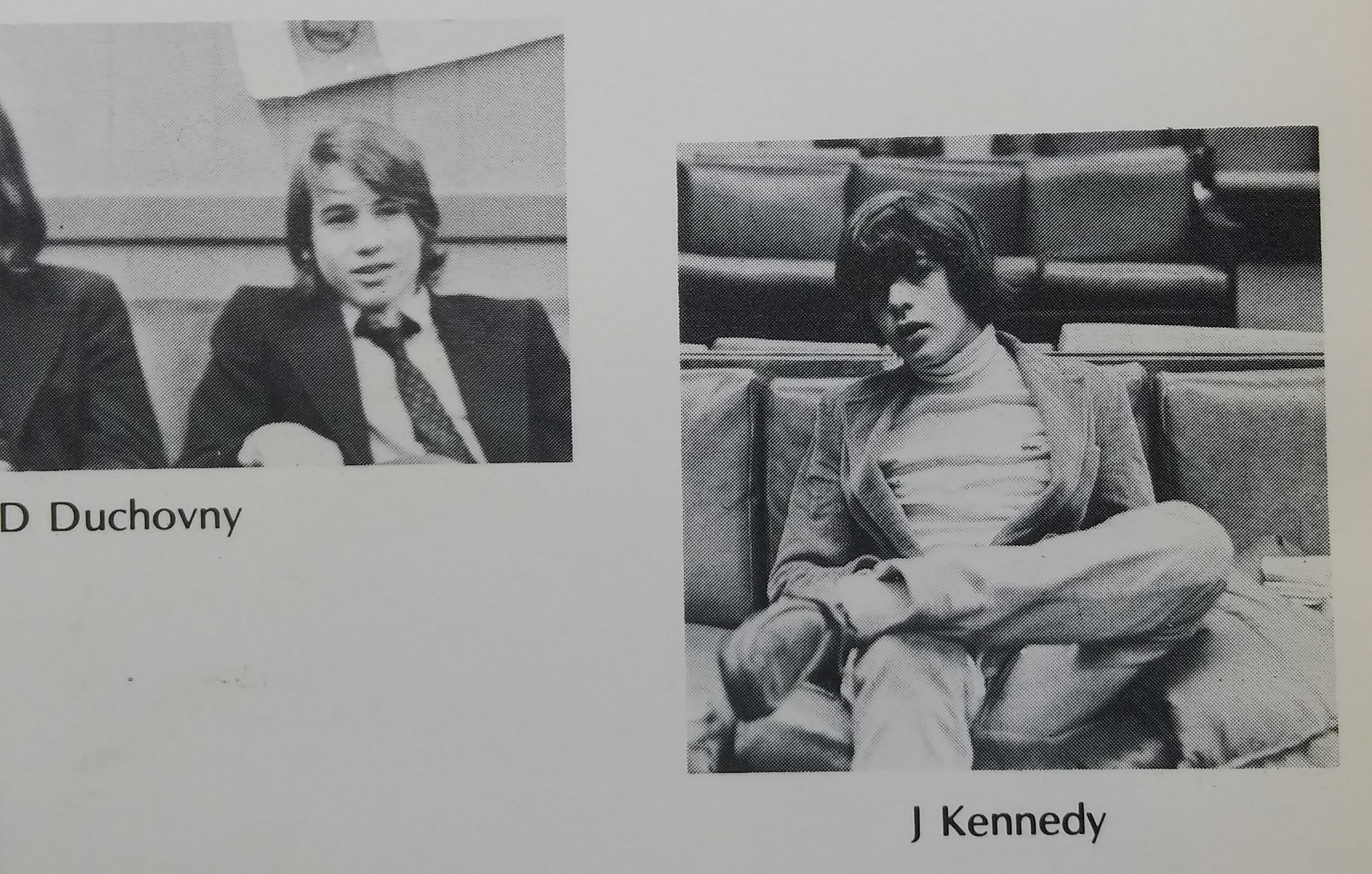
Duchovny and John F. Kennedy Jr. in 9th grade in the 1975 Collegiate yearbook

Duchovny was born in New York City in 1960. He is the son of Amram "Ami" Ducovny (1927–2003), a writer and publicist who worked for the American Jewish Committee, and Margaret "Meg" (née Miller), a school administrator and teacher. He is the middle child of three children. He has an elder brother, Daniel (b. 1956) and a younger sister, Laurie (b. 1966). Duchovny's mother is a Scottish immigrant from Whitehills, Aberdeen, Scotland. His father was Jewish, and his mother was Lutheran. His father dropped the h in his last name to avoid the sort of mispronunciations he encountered while serving in the Army. In the Polish language, duchowny means 'clergyman', and in the Ukrainian language it means 'spiritual'. Duchovny's paternal grandfather was a Jewish emigrant from Berdychiv, in 1918 Ukrainian People's Republic (now in Ukraine), and Duchovny's paternal grandmother was a Jewish emigrant from Congress Poland (now in Poland).

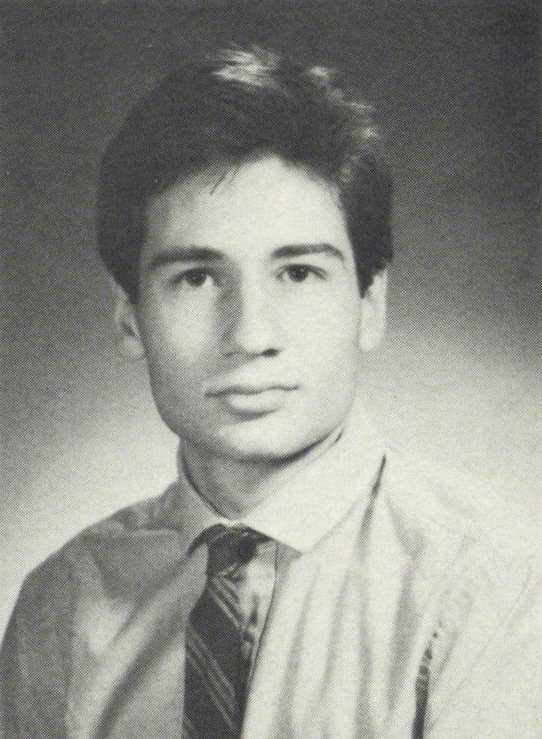
Duchovny in the Princeton University yearbook, 1982

Duchovny grew up in the Ukrainian Village, Manhattan and attended The Collegiate School For Boys in Upper West Side, Manhattan (where he was a classmate of John F. Kennedy Jr.), from which he graduated as head boy in 1978. He then attended Princeton University where he graduated Phi Beta Kappa and summa cum laude in 1982 with an A.B. in English literature. He was a member of Charter Club, one of the university's eating clubs. In 1982, his poetry received an honorable mention for a college prize from the Academy of American Poets. The title of his senior thesis was "The Schizophrenic Critique of Pure Reason in Beckett's Early Novels". He played junior varsity basketball at Princeton. He earned a Master of Arts in English Literature from Yale University and subsequently began work on a Ph.D. that remains unfinished. The title of his uncompleted doctoral thesis is Magic and Technology in Contemporary Fiction and Poetry.

=== Roots ===
Duchovny's great-great-grandfather and his family were from Berdychiv, Russian Empire (now Ukraine), and immigrated to Jaffa, then part of the former Ottoman Empire. In December 1914 his ancestors were among 6,000 Jews who were forcibly removed from their homes by police and deported by ship to Egypt. Duchovny's paternal grandfather was a Jewish emigrant from Berdychiv, Ukraine, and Duchovny's paternal grandmother was a Jewish emigrant from Congress Poland (now in Poland).

== Career ==
Duchovny appeared in an advertisement for Löwenbräu beer in 1987. The next year he appeared in Working Girl (1988). He had a small recurring role as Denise Bryson, a transgender DEA agent on the series Twin Peaks and played the narrator and host in the Showtime softcore erotica TV series Red Shoe Diaries. In 1991, he had a small role in the coming-of-age comedy Don't Tell Mom the Babysitter's Dead. In 1992, he had a small role in the family film Beethoven. That same year, he played the role of Rollie Totheroh in the biographic film Chaplin, directed by Richard Attenborough and based on the life of Charlie Chaplin.

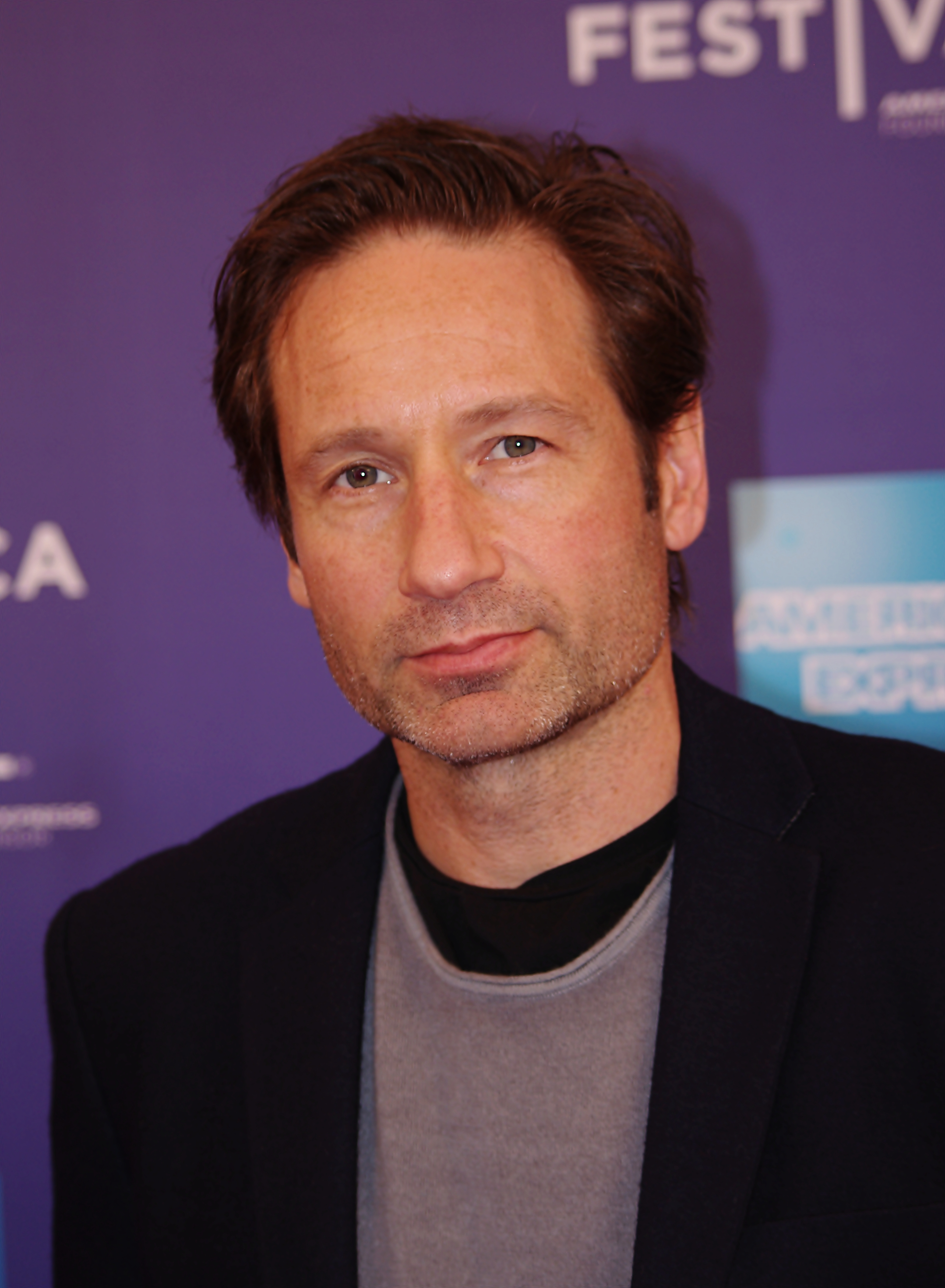
Duchovny at the Tribeca Film Festival in April 2011

In 1993, Duchovny began starring in the science fiction series The X-Files, as FBI Special Agent Fox Mulder, a conspiracy theorist who believed his sister had been abducted by aliens. The show evolved into a cult hit and became one of The Fox Network's first major television hits. According to The X-Files creator Chris Carter, Duchovny turned out to be one of the best-read people he knew. After getting the role, Duchovny thought the show would not last for long or make as much impact as it did. Executive producer Frank Spotnitz called Duchovny "amazingly smart". Spotnitz further stated that Duchovny was behind some of the main characteristic ideas behind Mulder. Also in 1993, Duchovny was cast alongside Brad Pitt and Juliette Lewis in the Dominic Sena-directed thriller Kalifornia.

During The X-Files run, in between the fifth and sixth seasons, Duchovny co-starred alongside Gillian Anderson in a 1998 film also titled The X-Files that continued the storyline. He remained with the series until leaving the show in 2001, partly because of a contract dispute that occurred after season seven finished filming. Duchovny appeared in half of the season eight episodes, but did not appear in season nine until the series finale in 2002. He also provided the voice for a parody of his Mulder character in the episode "The Springfield Files" of the animated comedy series The Simpsons. Duchovny has been nominated for four Emmy Awards.

Duchovny caused controversy when it became public that he was the primary reason for The X-Files moving filming locations from Vancouver, British Columbia, to Los Angeles in 1998. Many residents of Vancouver were upset with Duchovny over scripted jokes on Late Night with Conan O'Brien about the city's heavy rainfall, including one where he joked, "Vancouver is a very nice place if you like 400 inches of rainfall a day." (Duchovny's character Mulder would later reference this joke in the Season 5 episode "Schizogeny.") He also stated, "Of course, I'm tired of the rain. But if I wasn't married to a woman that lives in L.A., I'd stay in Vancouver. It's a lovely city." During the run of The X-Files, he also made several guest appearances in the cult TV satire The Larry Sanders Show, playing a fictionalized version of himself who is very attracted to Sanders. In the final episode of the series, he performed a parody of Sharon Stone's 'flashing' scene from Basic Instinct and a parody of Dr. Hannibal Lecter being introduced to Agent Clarice Starling in The Silence of the Lambs.

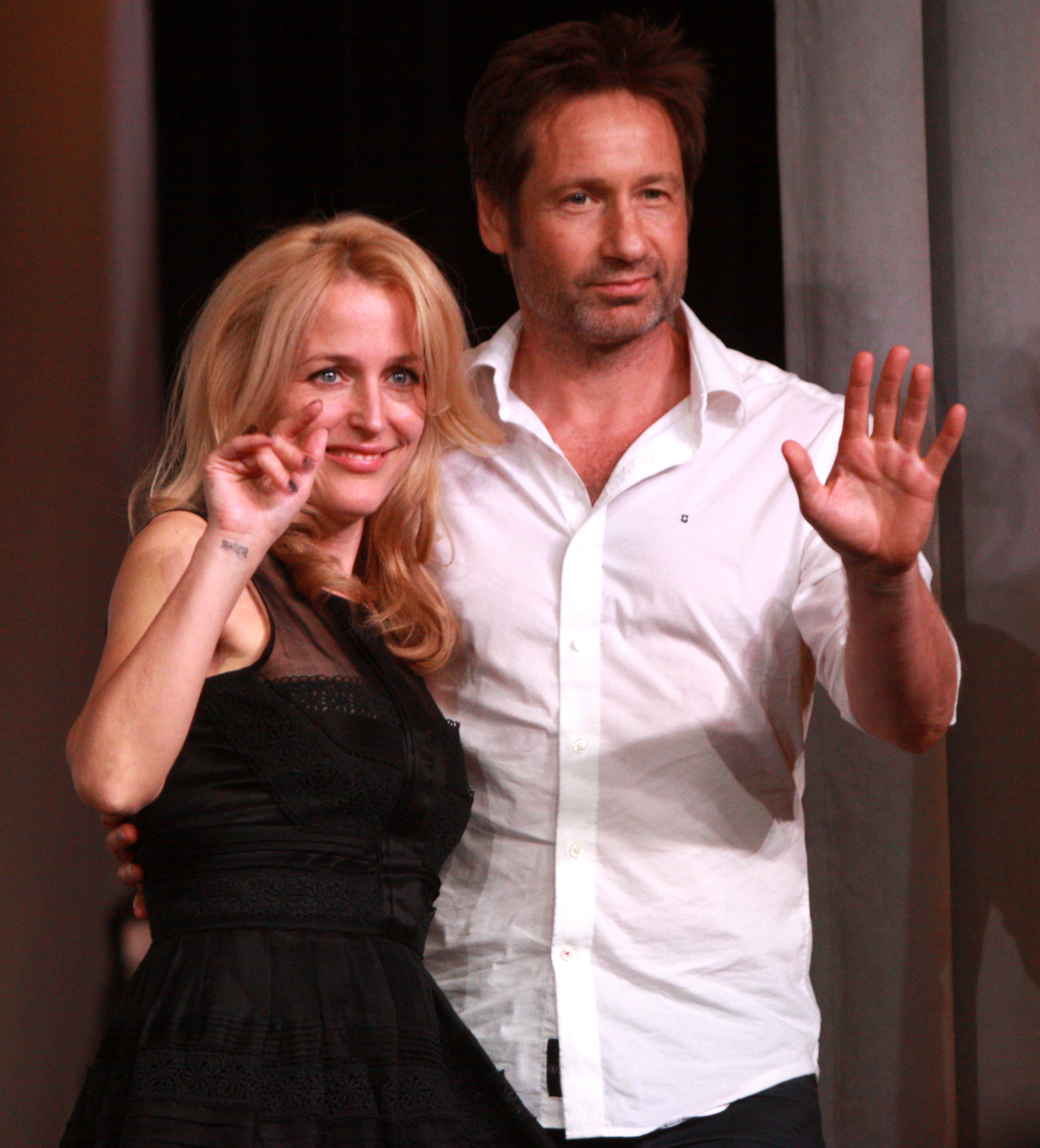
Duchovny with Gillian Anderson at the 2013 San Diego Comic-Con for The X-Files 20th Anniversary panel

Duchovny has guest-hosted Saturday Night Live twice (May 13, 1995, and May 9, 1998). Both shows were season finales. In 1997, he played lead role as a disgraced doctor with a drug problem who after losing his medical license, takes a job with the mob in the film Playing God. In 2000, he starred in the feature film Return to Me, a romantic comedy-drama directed by Bonnie Hunt and co-starring Minnie Driver and Carroll O'Connor. In 2001, Duchovny starred as Ira Kane in the sci-fi comedy film Evolution, alongside Seann William Scott, and had a cameo as hand model J.P. Prewitt in the Ben Stiller comedy Zoolander. He appeared in a celebrity edition of Who Wants to Be a Millionaire? in May 2000. He got to the $500,000 question, but answered incorrectly and lost $218,000, leaving him with $32,000. He appeared on Celebrity Jeopardy! in 1995 and 2010.

Duchovny provided the voice of Ethan Cole in the 2005 video game Area 51, as well as that of the title character in the 2003 video game XIII. In 2003 Duchovny starred in the 84th episode of the HBO show Sex and the City. He played the role of Jeremy, Carrie Bradshaw's high-school ex-boyfriend, who has committed himself to a Connecticut mental health facility. In 2004, he starred in the comedy film Connie and Carla with Nia Vardalos. In 2005, Duchovny provided the voice-over for a PSA radio campaign for Act Against Violence. In 2005, Duchovny, who had already made his directorial debut with an episode of The X-Files, wrote, directed, and appeared in the feature film House of D. The film starred Anton Yelchin, Robin Williams, and Duchovny's then-wife Téa Leoni in a coming-of-age tale. It received mostly poor reviews and little box office success. Duchovny also directed "Judas on a Pole," an episode of Bones, during the show's second season.

From 2007 to 2014, Duchovny played the troubled, womanizing novelist Hank Moody in the Showtime series Californication. The portrayal landed him a Golden Globe Award for Best Actor in a Television Comedy or Musical in 2007. In 2009, he starred in the comedy drama film The Joneses with Demi Moore. In March 2014, NBC announced that a new TV series, entitled Aquarius, would be produced starring Duchovny. Duchovny portrayed a 1960s police sergeant investigating small-time criminal and budding cult leader Charles Manson. In March 2015, Duchovny was announced as returning in a six-episode continuation of The X-Files. It premiered on January 24, 2016, on Fox.

As a musician, Duchovny has released four studio albums: Hell or Highwater (2015), Every Third Thought (2018), Gestureland (2021), and Prince of Pieces (2026). He began his recording career with Hell or Highwater, an album of original songs released in May 2015. Since then, he has continued to record and perform with his longtime band, touring in North America, Europe and Australia. He has also released four novels: Holy Cow (2015), Bucky F*cking Dent (2016), Miss Subways (2018), Truly Like Lightning (2021), and a novella, The Reservoir (2021). In 2022, Duchovny released the film Reverse the Curse (based on his novel Bucky F*cking Dent), which he wrote, directed, and acted in. In 2025, he began hosting the series Secrets Declassified with David Duchovny on the History Channel.

== Personal life ==
Duchovny and actress Téa Leoni married on May 13, 1997. They have two children, daughter Madelaine West Duchovny, born in April 1999, and son Kyd Miller Duchovny, born in June 2002.

In 2008, the couple separated; Duchovny received treatment for sex addiction from August to October. Claims by the Daily Mail that he had an affair with Hungarian tennis instructor Edit Pakay led to legal threats and a retraction by the paper on November 15. In 2009, Duchovny and Leoni reunited but separated again on June 29, 2011. Duchovny filed for divorce in June 2014, and the couple had agreed to settlement terms by that August.

In 2017, he began dating Monique Pendleberry. They married in February 2025.

Duchovny is a pescetarian. He is supportive of environmentalism, and is an enthusiast of electric vehicle technology. He made an appearance at the 2011 Tribeca Film Festival in support of the film Revenge of the Electric Car.

== Filmography ==
=== Film ===
Year	Title	Role	Notes
1988	Working Girl	Tess's Friend	
1989	New Year's Day	Billy	
1990	Denial	John	
1990	Bad Influence	Club Goer	
1991	Don't Tell Mom the Babysitter's Dead	Bruce	
1991	The Rapture	Randy	
1992	Ruby	Officer Tippit	
1992	Beethoven	Brad Wilson	
1992	Red Shoe Diaries	Jake Winters	
1992	Venice/Venice	Dylan	
1992	Chaplin	Roland Totheroh	
1993	Kalifornia	Brian Kessler	
1997	Playing God	Dr. Eugene Sands	
1998	The X-Files: Fight The Future	FBI Special Agent Fox Mulder	
2000	Return to Me	Bob Rueland	
2001	Evolution	Dr. Ira Kane	
2001	Zoolander	JP Prewitt	
2002	Full Frontal	Bill / Gus	
2004	Connie and Carla	Jeff	
2004	House of D	Tom Warshaw	Also writer and director
2005	Trust the Man	Tom	
2006	Queer Duck: the Movie	Tiny Jesus (voice)	
2006	The TV Set	Mike Klein	
2007	Things We Lost in the Fire	Brian Burke	
2007	The Secret	Dr. Benjamin Marris	
2007	Quantum Hoops	Narrator (voice)	Documentary film
2008	The X-Files: I Want to Believe	Fox Mulder	
2009	The Joneses	Steve Jones	
2012	Goats	Goat Man	
2013	Phantom	Bruni	
2013	Louder Than Words	John Fareri	
2020	The Craft: Legacy	Adam Harrison	
2022	The Bubble	Dustin Mulray	
2022	The Estate	Richard	
2023	You People	Arnold	
2023	Pet Sematary: Bloodlines	Bill Baterman	
2023	What Happens Later	William "Bill" Davis	
2023	Reverse the Curse	Marty	Also writer, producer and director
2024	Adam the First	James	
2024	Veselka: The Rainbow on the Corner at the Center of the World	Narrator (voice)	Documentary film
2026	See You When I See You	Robert Whistler	
TBA	Young Men	Mark	Post-production
TBA	The Exiles		Post-production
TBA	Monsanto		Filming

=== Television ===
Year	Title	Role	Notes
1990–1991	Twin Peaks	DEA Agent Denise Bryson	3 episodes
1992	Baby Snatcher	David Anderson	Television film
1992–1997	Red Shoe Diaries	Jake Winters	66 episodes
1993–2002; 2016–2018	The X-Files	FBI Special Agent Fox Mulder	Main role, starred in 191 episodes also wrote and directed a few episodes.
1995–1998	The Larry Sanders Show	Himself	3 episodes
1995–1998	Saturday Night Live	Host / himself	2 episodes
1995	Eek! The Cat	Fox Mulder (voice)	Episode: "Eek Space 9"
1996	Frasier	Tom (voice)	Episode: "Frasier Loves Roz"
1996	Space: Above and Beyond	Handsome Alvin	Episode: "R&R"
1997	The Simpsons	FBI Special Agent Fox Mulder (voice)	Episode: "The Springfield Files"
1997	Duckman	Richard (voice)	Episode: "The Girls of Route Canal"
1998	Dr. Katz, Professional Therapist	Himself	Episode: "Metaphors"
2001	The Lone Gunmen	Fox Mulder	Episode: #12 All About Yves
2002	Primetime Glick	Himself	2 episodes
2002	Life with Bonnie	Johnny Volcano	2 episodes
2003	Sex and the City	Jeremy	Episode: "Boy, Interrupted"
2007–2014	Californication	Hank Moody	84 episodes
2015–2016	Aquarius	Sam Hodiak	26 episodes
2016	Better Things	Himself	Episode: "Brown"
2017	Twin Peaks	Denise Bryson	Episode: "Part 4"
2021	The Chair	Himself	Episode: "The Last Bus in Town"
2021–2023	Ten Year Old Tom	Ice Cream Man (voice)	6 episodes
2023	History of the World, Part II	Howard Cosell impersonator	Episode: "VIII"
2024	The Sympathizer	Ryan Glenn/Thespian	3 episodes
2025	Secrets Declassified with David Duchovny	Himself	30 episodes
2025	Malice	Jamie Tanner	6 episodes

=== Video games ===
Year	Title	Voice role
1998	The X-Files Game	Fox Mulder
2003	XIII	Jason Fly
2004	The X-Files: Resist or Serve	Fox Mulder
2005	Area 51	Ethan Cole

=== Audiobooks ===
- 2015: Audiobook To Legend He Goes: A Tale from The Legend of Drizzt
- 2017: Audiobook X-Files - cold cases - an Audible original
- 2017: Audiobook X files - stolen lives - an Audible original

== Bibliography ==
- 2011: Introduction to: Coach: 25 Writers Reflect on People Who Made a Difference ISBN 978-1-4384-3734-7.
- 2015: Holy Cow: A Modern-Day Dairy Tale, Farrar, Straus and Giroux ISBN 978-0-374-17207-7.
- 2016: Bucky F*cking Dent, Farrar, Straus and Giroux ISBN 978-0-374-11042-0.
- 2018: Miss Subways: A Novel, Farrar, Straus and Giroux ISBN 978-0-374-21040-3.
- 2021: Truly Like Lightning: A Novel, Farrar, Straus and Giroux ISBN 978-0-374-27774-1.
- 2022: The Reservoir: A Novella, Akashic Books ISBN 978-1-636-14044-5.
- 2022: Kepler, Dark Horse Books ISBN 978-1506733456.
- 2025: About Time: Poems, Akashic Books ISBN 978-1636142630

== Discography ==
Studio albums
Year	Title	Refs.
2015	Hell or Highwater	
2018	Every Third Thought	
2021	Gestureland	
2026	Prince of Pieces	

== See also ==
- List of Golden Globe winners
