= Antonio de Viti de Marco =

Italian economist (1858–1943)

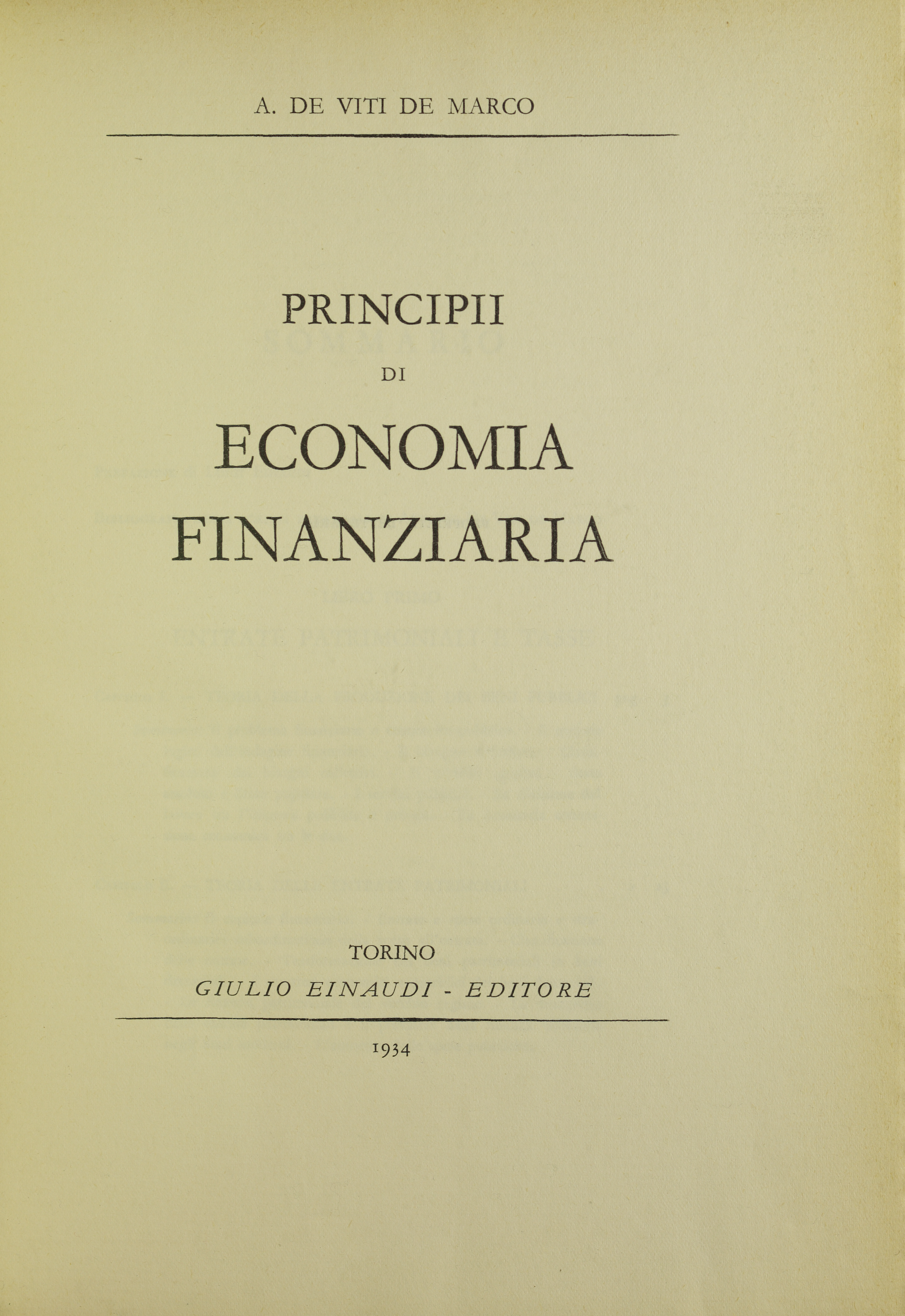
Principii di economia finanziaria, 1934

Antonio de Viti de Marco (30 September 1858 – 1 December 1943) was an Italian economist. Born in Lecce, he was professor of public finance in Rome from 1887 until 1931, when he resigned rather than take an oath of loyalty to the Italian fascism regime. He was a longtime editor of the Giornale degli Economisti. He has been described as "an unyielding defender of liberalism". His writings on public goods, taxation, and public debt set the foundation for the modern public choice theory.

== Bibliography ==
- Buchanan, James M. (1960). Fiscal Theory and Political Economy. Chapel Hill, NC: North Carolina University Press.
- Mosca, Manuela (2016). Antonio de Viti de Marco: A Story Worth Remembering. Palgrave Macmillan. ISBN 978-1137534927.
- Buchanan, James (2008). "Italian Economic Theorists". In Hamowy, Ronald (ed.). The Encyclopedia of Libertarianism. Thousand Oaks, CA: SAGE; Cato Institute. pp. 258–60. doi:10.4135/9781412965811.n156. ISBN 978-1-4129-6580-4. LCCN 2008009151. OCLC 750831024.
