= Maffeo Pantaleoni =

Italian economist (1857–1924)

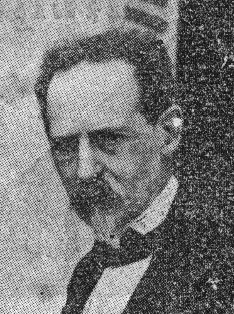
- Born: 2 July 1857; Frascati, Papal States
- Died: 29 October 1924 (aged 67); Milan, Kingdom of Italy

Academic background
- Influences: David Ricardo; Léon Walras

Academic work
- School or tradition: Neoclassical economics
- Notable students: Antonio de Viti de Marco; Vilfredo Pareto

Maffeo Pantaleoni (Italian: [mafˌfɛːo pantaleˈoːni]; 2 July 1857 – 29 October 1924) was an Italian economist. Born in Frascati, at first he was a notable proponent of neoclassical economics. Later in his life, before and during World War I, he became an ardent Italian nationalist and syndicalist, with close ties to the Italian fascism movement. He was Minister of Finance in the Carnaro government of Gabriele D'Annunzio at Fiume, which lasted for fifteen months between 1919 and 1920. Shortly before his death in Milan, he was appointed to the Italian Senate.

== Work ==
Pantaleoni was a major contributor to the Italian school of economics known as La Scienza delle Finanze. His book Teoria della Traslazione dei Tributi (Theory of Tax Shifting) is a pioneering study of tax incidence. According to Nobel Prize winner James M. Buchanan, Pantaleoni and his followers (such as Antonio de Viti de Marco and Vilfredo Pareto) can be considered the intellectual forefathers of the modern public choice theory.

== Family ==
Maffeo's great-grandniece is American actress Téa Leoni.

== Bibliography (selection) ==
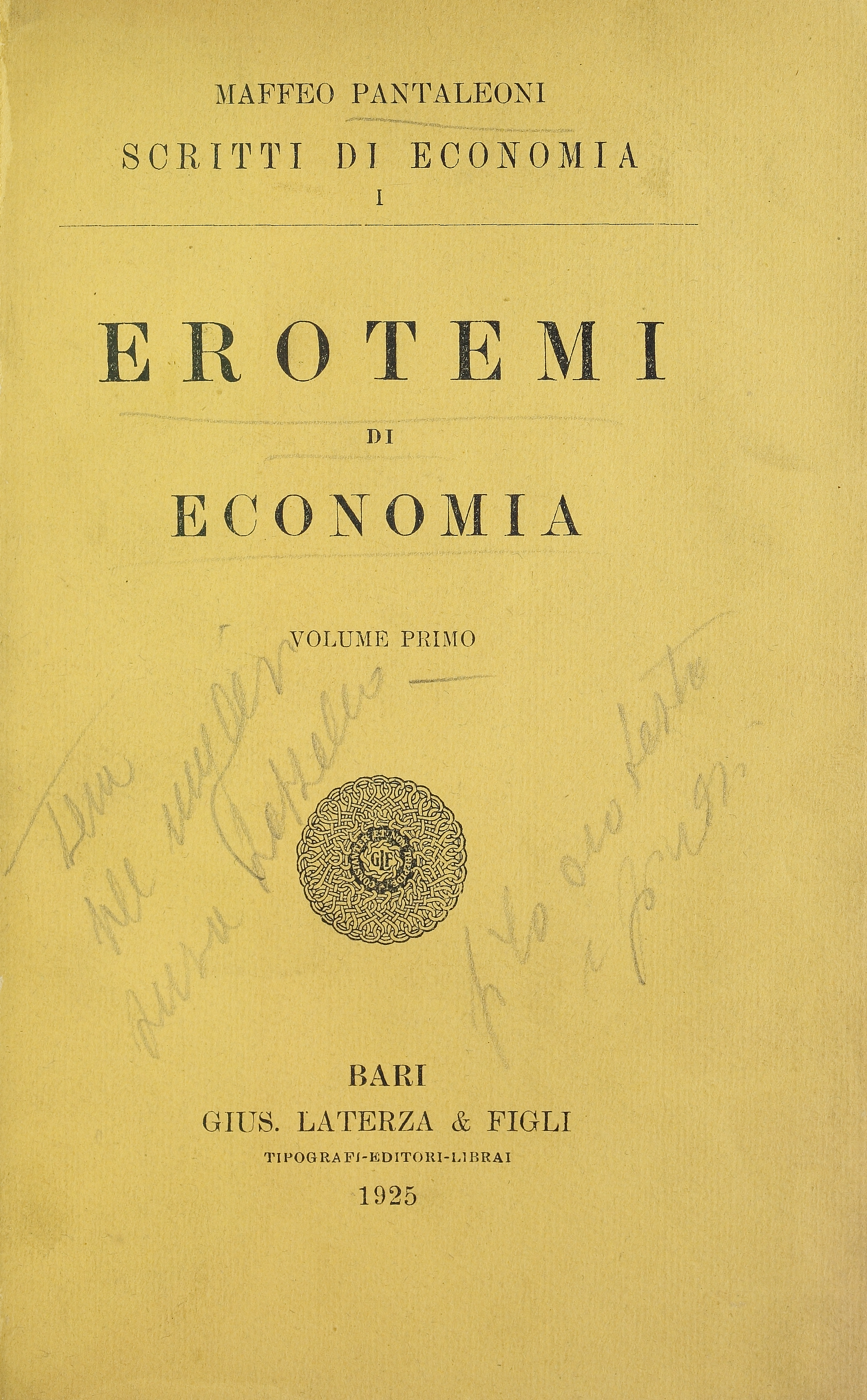
Erotemi di economia, 1925

- Teoria della traslazione dei tributi, 1882.
- Contributions to the Theory of the Distribution of Public Expenditure, 1883.
- Dell'ammontare probabile della ricchezza privata in Italia, 1884.
- Pure Economics. Translated by T. Boston Bruce. London: Macmillan & Co., Limited. 1898 – via Internet Archive. ISBN 1444606816. ISBN 9781444606812
- A proposito di Luigi Cossa e della sua "Histoire des Doctrines économiques", 1898, GdE.
- Dei criteri che devono informare la storia delle dottrine economiche, 1898, GdE.
- An attempt to analyze the concepts of "Strong" and "Weak" in their economic connexion, 1898, EJ.
- Una visione cinematografica del progresso della scienza economica, 1870–1907, 1907, GdE.
- Note in Margine della Guerra, 1917.
- Politica, 1918.
- Erotemi di Economica, 1925.
