= Téa Leoni =

American actress (born 1966)

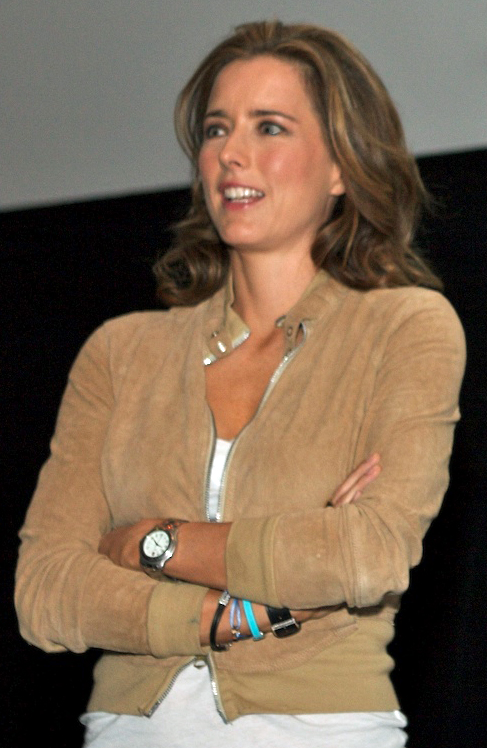
- Leoni in 2007
- Born: Elizabeth Téa Pantaleoni; February 25, 1966 (age 60); New York City, U.S.
- Occupation: Actress
- Years active: 1988–present
- Spouse(s): Neil Joseph Tardio Jr. (m. 1991; div. 1995) David Duchovny (m. 1997; div. 2014) Tim Daly (m. 2025)
- Children: 2, including West Duchovny
- Relatives: Amram Ducovny (ex-father-in-law); Daniel Duchovny (ex-brother-in-law); Hank Patterson (great-uncle, dec.); Tyne Daly (sister-in-law)

Téa Leoni (/ˈteɪ.ə leɪˈoʊni/; born Elizabeth Téa Pantaleoni; February 25, 1966) is an American actress. Early in her career, she starred on the television sitcoms Flying Blind (1992–1993) and The Naked Truth (1995–1998). Her breakthrough role was in the 1995 film Bad Boys, which led to leading parts in Deep Impact (1998), The Family Man (2000), Jurassic Park III (2001), Spanglish (2004), and Fun with Dick and Jane (2005). From 2014 to 2019, Leoni starred as Secretary of State Elizabeth McCord on the CBS drama series Madam Secretary.

== Early life and family ==
Leoni was born on February 25, 1966, in New York City. Her mother, Emily Ann (née Patterson), was a dietitian and nutritionist, and her father, Anthony Pantaleoni, was a corporate lawyer with the firm Fulbright & Jaworski. Her paternal grandfather was of Italian, English, and Irish descent; he was a nephew of Italian economist and politician Maffeo Pantaleoni.

Leoni's paternal grandmother, American silent film actress and humanitarian Helenka Adamowska Pantaleoni, was born in Brookline, Massachusetts, to Polish musicians Józef Adamowski and Antonina Szumowska-Adamowska. Leoni's mother is a native of Amarillo, Texas. She is a grandniece of actor Hank Patterson.

Leoni grew up in Englewood, New Jersey, and New York City, and attended The Elisabeth Morrow School, Brearley School and The Putney School in Vermont. She attended but did not complete studies at Sarah Lawrence College.

In a 2017 episode of Finding Your Roots, hosted by Henry Louis Gates Jr., Leoni discovered that her mother Emily, who was adopted, is the biological daughter of Mavis Abilene Gindratt from Vick, Louisiana, and Sumpter James Daniel, whose ancestors originated in Ireland. The Daniels immigrated to Virginia in the early 18th century, and founded a farm in Fairfax County, seven miles from that of George Washington. Her mother's adoptive parents were Florry Elizabeth (née Roberts) and Virgil Pearson Patterson.

== Career ==
In 1988, Leoni was cast as one of the stars of Angels 88, an updated version of the 1970s show Charlie's Angels. After production delays, the show never aired. The following year, she was cast as Lisa DiNapoli in the NBC daytime soap opera Santa Barbara. In 1991, she made her film debut with a small role in the comedy Switch and later played another small part in A League of Their Own (1992).

From 1992 to 1993, Leoni starred with Corey Parker in the short-lived Fox sitcom Flying Blind. In February 1995, she appeared in the sitcom Frasier, a spinoff from Cheers, as the fiancée of Sam Malone (played by Ted Danson).

Later in that year, she landed the lead role in the ABC/NBC sitcom The Naked Truth, playing Nora Wilde, a tabloid news journalist. The show ran through 1998. Leoni had the female lead role in the 1995 action comedy film Bad Boys, which was a box office success, grossing over $141 million worldwide.

After leaving television, Leoni had a leading role in Deep Impact (1998), a big-budget disaster film featuring projected effects of a comet hurtling towards Earth. The film received mixed reviews from critics but was a success at the box office, grossing $349 million worldwide. She later had main roles in two other big budget movies: romantic comedy The Family Man (2000), co-starring alongside Nicolas Cage, and science fiction film Jurassic Park III (2001) as William H. Macy's character's ex-wife. In 2002, she starred as a film studio executive in Hollywood Ending, directed by Woody Allen and had a supporting role in the box office bomb crime drama People I Know. In 2004, she appeared as the wife of Adam Sandler's character in the financially unsuccessful comedy-drama Spanglish. In 2005, Leoni starred alongside Jim Carrey in the comedy film Fun with Dick and Jane. The movie grossed $202 million at the box office worldwide.

Leoni co-starred in a number of small films in the late 2000s, including You Kill Me and The Smell of Success. She co-starred opposite Ricky Gervais in the 2008 supernatural comedy-drama Ghost Town. In 2011, she had a supporting role in the heist comedy film, Tower Heist. In 2011, she was also cast alongside Hope Davis as leads in the HBO comedy pilot, Spring/Fall; however, the pilot was not picked up.

Leoni starred as Elizabeth McCord in the CBS political drama Madam Secretary, which ran from September 21, 2014, to December 8, 2019.

== Personal life ==
Leoni married Neil Joseph Tardio Jr., a television commercial producer, on June 8, 1991, at St. Luke's Episcopal Church in Hope Township, New Jersey. They divorced in 1995.

Leoni married actor David Duchovny on May 13, 1997, after an eight-week courtship. They have two children, daughter Madelaine West Duchovny and son Kyd Miller Duchovny. In 2008, Leoni and Duchovny separated. The couple reconciled in 2009 but separated again in June 2011. Duchovny filed for divorce in June 2014, and the couple had agreed to settlement terms by that August.

Leoni began dating Tim Daly, her Madam Secretary co-star, in December 2014. They are both alumni of The Putney School. Leoni and Daly were married on July 12, 2025, in New York in an intimate family wedding.

=== Humanitarian work ===
Leoni was named a UNICEF goodwill ambassador in 2001. She has been a member of UNICEF's national board since 2004. Helenka Pantaleoni, her paternal grandmother, was the president of the U.S. Fund for UNICEF for more than 25 years.

=== Asteroid ===
Asteroid 8299 Téaleoni, discovered by Eric Elst at La Silla in 1993, was named after Leoni in 2000.

== Filmography ==
=== Film ===
Year	Title	Role	Notes
1991	Switch	Connie the Dream Girl	
1992	A League of Their Own	Racine 1st Base	
1994	Wyatt Earp	Sally	
1995	Bad Boys	Julie Mott	
1996	Flirting with Disaster	Tina Kalb	
1998	Deep Impact	Jenny Lerner	
1998	There's No Fish Food in Heaven	Landeene	Also executive producer; also known as Life in the Fast Lane
2000	The Family Man	Kate Reynolds	
2001	Jurassic Park III	Amanda Kirby	
2002	People I Know	Jilli Hopper	
2002	Hollywood Ending	Ellie	
2004	House of D	Mrs. Warshaw	
2004	Spanglish	Deborah Clasky	
2005	Fun with Dick and Jane	Jane Harper	
2007	You Kill Me	Laurel Pearson	Also executive producer
2008	Ghost Town	Gwen	
2009	The Smell of Success	Rosemary Rose	
2011	Tower Heist	Special Agent Claire Denham	
2025	Death of a Unicorn	Belinda Leopold	
2025	Bird Boy	Emmie Khumalo	

=== Television ===
Year	Title	Role	Notes
1989	Santa Barbara	Lisa DiNapoli	Temporary replacement for Tawny Kitaen
1992–1993	Flying Blind	Alicia	Main cast
1994	The Counterfeit Contessa	Gina Leonarda Nardino	Television film
1995	Frasier	Sheila	Episode: "The Show Where Sam Shows Up"
1995–1998	The Naked Truth	Nora Wilde	Main cast
2000	The X-Files	Herself	Episode: "Hollywood A.D."
2011	Spring/Fall	Margo	Television film
2014–2019	Madam Secretary	Elizabeth McCord	Main cast; also producer
2024–2025	Only Murders in the Building	Sofia Caccimelio	Recurring cast
2026	Newlyweds	Jeanie	Main cast

== Awards and nominations ==
Year	Nominated work	Award	Category	Result
1998	Deep Impact	Blockbuster Entertainment Awards	Favorite Actress – Sci-Fi	Nominated
2000	The Family Man	Blockbuster Entertainment Awards	Favorite Actress – Sci-Fi	Nominated
2000	The Family Man	Saturn Awards	Best Actress	Won
2006	Herself	TV Land Awards	Little Screen/Big Screen Star – Female	Nominated
2014	Madam Secretary	People's Choice Awards	Favorite Actress in a New TV Series	Nominated
2016	Madam Secretary	CBS MVP Awards	Best Motivational Speech	Nominated
