= The C Word (film) =

- Directed by: Meghan O'Hara
- Written by: Meghan O'Hara
- Produced by: Lori McCreary; Nick McKinney; Meghan O'Hara; Simone Pero; Brennan Rees; Pascaline Servan-Schreiber; Morgan Freeman
- Starring: David Servan-Schreiber; Don Barrett; Richard Béliveau; Lorenzo Cohen; Ronald DePinho
- Narrated by: Morgan Freeman
- Cinematography: Topaz Adizes; Nelson Hume
- Edited by: Francisco Bello; Bryan Gunnar Cole; Lorian James Delman
- Music by: City Of The Sun; Bob Golden; Erin O'Hara
- Production companies: A Zorro and Me Films; Honest Engine TV; Revelations Entertainment
- Distributed by: Abramorama
- Release date: April 6, 2016 (Cleveland)
- Running time: 89 minutes
- Country: United States
- Languages: English; French

The C Word is a 2016 documentary film about the effort to prevent cancer, particularly the research of Dr. David Servan-Schreiber, and addresses the failure of Western medicine's approach to cancer.

Produced and directed by cancer survivor Meghan L. O'Hara, it is narrated by Morgan Freeman.

== Synopsis ==
The director began making the film after surviving Stage 3 breast cancer.

The film identifies four factors to reduce the risk of cancer— diet, exercise, stress management, and toxin avoidance.

== Cast ==
- David Servan-Schreiber
- Meghan L. O'Hara
- Don Barrett
- Richard Beliveau, Ph.D.
- Lorenzo Cohen, Ph.D.
- Ronald DePinho, M.D.
- Scott Morris, M.D., M.Div.
- Michael Moss
- Matthieu Ricard
- Ronald Stram, M.D.
- David Andrews, PH.D.
- Anil K. Sood, M.D.
- Donald Light
- Jonathan Cohen
- Tony Smith
- Jan Schakowsky
- Gabe Canales
- Liz Formosa
- Brenda Jones
- Chris Wark
- Meg Hirschberg
- Gwenaelle Briseul
- Edouard Servan-Schreiber

== Release ==
=== Critical response ===
In a review for Spirituality & Health, Bilge Ebiri called The C Word a "well-produced documentary" and "a compassionate, touching film."
