= Brad Silberling =

American film director

- Born: Bradley Mitchell Silberling; September 8, 1963 (age 63); Washington D.C., U.S.
- Education: University of California, Santa Barbara (B.A. 1984)
- Occupations: Director, producer, screenwriter, actor
- Years active: 1987–present
- Notable work: Casper; City of Angels; Moonlight Mile; Lemony Snicket's A Series of Unfortunate Events; Land of the Lost
- Spouse: Amy Brenneman (m. 1995)
- Partner: Rebecca Schaeffer (1987–1989; her death)
- Children: 2

Bradley Mitchell Silberling (born September 8, 1963) is an American television and film director whose credits include the feature films Casper (1995), City of Angels (1998), Moonlight Mile (2002), Lemony Snicket's A Series of Unfortunate Events (2004), and Land of the Lost (2009).

== Early life and education ==
Silberling was born in Washington, D.C., the son of Joyce Anne (née Tucker), a travel consultant, and Robert Murray Silberling, who was Vice President of CBS Entertainment Productions. His father was born Jewish, whereas his mother converted to Judaism. Silberling attended Williams College in Williamstown, MA and received a BA in English from UC Santa Barbara. He later studied film directing at the UCLA Film School.

== Career ==
Silberling began his entertainment industry career before completing his studies. In 1986, he became a Production Assistant for a children's program. He then began to direct television and film. Silberling's 2002 film, Moonlight Mile, is loosely based on his bereavement following the murder of his girlfriend, actress Rebecca Schaeffer, in 1989. In 2006, Silberling's movie 10 Items or Less was the first movie made legally available for download during its theatrical run. This became possible through ClickStar and Silberling's close relationship with its owners Morgan Freeman and Lori McCreary. On March 1, 1999, he started out his own production company Reveal Entertainment, with a first-look development deal at DreamWorks. The first project under Reveal was an attempt to purchase the script The Mystery Dance, for himself to direct in mind, but the idea was later scrapped.

Silberling was approached by Warner Bros. as one of the candidates to direct Harry Potter and the Sorcerer's Stone in 1998. Although he began to enthusiastically plan the film in his mind and was ready to sign on to direct it, Chris Columbus was ultimately chosen as the director. On October 22, 2014, his Reveal Entertainment company signed a deal with CBS Television Studios. He is currently signed with ICM Partners.

== Personal life ==
Silberling previously dated Rebecca Schaeffer, whom he met at UCLA film school, until she was murdered in 1989. In 1995, he married actress Amy Brenneman, whom he met on the set of NYPD Blue and with whom he has two children, Charlotte and Bodhi, in Pasadena. In 2000, the couple purchased a home in Chilmark, Massachusetts prior to moving to West Tisbury, Massachusetts in 2011.

== Filmography ==
Films

Year	Title	Director	Producer	Writer
1995	Casper	Yes	No	No
1998	City of Angels	Yes	No	No
2002	Moonlight Mile	Yes	Yes	Yes
2004	Lemony Snicket's A Series of Unfortunate Events	Yes	No	No
2006	10 Items or Less	Yes	Yes	Yes
2009	Land of the Lost	Yes	executive	No
2017	An Ordinary Man	Yes	Yes	Yes

Television

Year	Title	Director	Executive Producer	Notes
1989	Alfred Hitchcock Presents	Yes	No	Episode: "Driving Under the Influence"
1990–1991	Doogie Howser, M.D.	Yes	No	Episodes: "Car Wars", "The Doctor, the Wife, her Son and the Job", "Doogstruck"
1990	Cop Rock	Yes	No	Episode: "Potts Don't Fail Me Now"
1991–1992	Brooklyn Bridge	Yes	No	Episodes: "Boys of Summer", "Great Expectations", "A Tale of Two Boroughs"
1992	Great Scott!	Yes	No	Also supervising producer, Directed 5 episodes
1992	Civil Wars	Yes	No	Episode: "Shop 'Til You Drop"
1992	L.A. Law	Yes	No	Episode: "I'm Ready for My Closeup, Mr. Markowitz"
1993, 1996	NYPD Blue	Yes	No	Episodes: "Personal Foul", "Oscar, Meyer, Weiner", "Thick Stu"
1994	The Byrds of Paradise	Yes	No	Episode: "Pilot"
1998	Felicity	Yes	No	Episode: "Hot Objects"
2001	Judging Amy	Yes	No	Episode: "One for the Road"
2011	Hail Mary	Yes	Yes	TV movie
2013–2017	Reign	Yes	Yes	Directed episode "Pilot"
2014–2019	Jane the Virgin	Yes	Yes	Directed 9 episodes
2015	Down Dog	Yes	Yes	TV movie
2016	Heartbeat	No	Yes	
2016–2017	No Tomorrow	Yes	Yes	Directed episode "Pilot"
2017–2022	Dynasty	Yes	Yes	Directed episodes "I Hardly Recognized You" and "Rotten Things"
2018–2022	Charmed	Yes	Yes	Directed episodes "Pilot" and "You're Dead to Me"
2020	Dash & Lily	Yes	Yes	Directed episodes "Dash" and "Lily"
2023	So Help Me Todd	Yes	No	Episode: "Against All Todds"
2024	Matlock	Yes	No	Episode: "A Guy Named Greg"
2026	It's Not Like That	Yes	Yes	2 episodes
2026	Best Medicine	Yes	No	Episode: "Hare Today, Gone Tomorrow"
