= Revelations Entertainment =

Movie production company

- Type: Production company
- Industry: Film
- Founded: 1996; 30 years ago
- Founder: Morgan Freeman; Lori McCreary
- Headquarters: United States
- Key people: Lori McCreary; Morgan Freeman

Revelations Entertainment is an independent movie production company founded by actor Morgan Freeman and business partner Lori McCreary in 1996. Its mission statement, to "reveal truth," drives the company to produce thought-provoking entertainment with artistic integrity and "soul."

In 2006, Revelations became the first film production company in history to distribute a film (10 Items or Less) online while the movie was still playing in theaters. This was achieved by using ClickStar (also founded by Freeman and McCreary as a joint venture with Intel Corporation) as their online distribution site.

== Productions ==
Revelations Entertainment is behind several well-known movie and TV productions, including:

- Bopha! (1993)
- Mutiny (1999)
- Under Suspicion (2000)
- Along Came a Spider (2001)
- Levity (2003)
- 10 Items or Less (2006)
- The Contract (2006)
- Invictus (2009)
- Feast of Love (2007)
- Thick as Thieves (2009)
- The Maiden Heist (2009)
- Curiosity: Season 1, Episode 5 – "Is There a Parallel Universe?" (4 Sep. 2011)
- Through the Wormhole (Discovery Science Channel TV Series 2010–2017)
- The Magic of Belle Isle (2012)
- "2012 Image Control Assessment Series" (2012)
- Stem Cell Universe with Stephen Hawking (2014) (TV)
- Man vs. the Universe (2014), mini-series
- 5 Flights Up (2014)
- Madam Secretary (CBS, 2014–2019) (TV) Seasons 1 to 4
- Food: Fact or Fiction? (2015-2019)
- A Pastor, a Rabbi, and an Imam (2016), mini-series
- The Story of God with Morgan Freeman (2016)
- The Story of Us with Morgan Freeman (2017)
- The World's Biggest Ghost Hunt: Pennhurst Asylum (2019)
- The Killing of Kenneth Chamberlain (2019)
- The Rosie O'Donnell Show: A Benefit for the Actors Fund (2020)
- "The Last Drop" (2021)
- Hunting Atlantis (2021-)
- Great Escapes with Morgan Freeman (2021-)
- 57 Seconds (2023)
- In Our Blood (2024)
- Rode to Ruin (TBA)

These productions have involved established actors such as Monica Bellucci, Kirsten Dunst, Danny Glover, Gene Hackman, Holly Hunter, Thomas Jane, Paz Vega, Zina Pistor and Billy Bob Thornton.

== Investments ==
In 2009 Revelations Entertainment signed on to financially back Digiboo, a digital Kiosk company. Digiboo's touch-screen kiosks can hold more than 1,000 movie and TV shows, which can be downloaded to USB 3.0 flash devices within a minute. Revelations Digital CEO Samuel Edge will serve as the chief technology officer at Digiboo.

The ClickStar online movie service, a joint venture between production company Revelations Entertainment and chip-maker Intel Corporation, stopped operations in 2008.
