= Séminaire Saint-Joseph de Trois-Rivières =

- Coat of arms

Location
- 858, rue Laviolette; Trois-Rivières, Quebec, G9A 5S3; Canada; 46°20′55″N 72°32′41″W

Information
- School type: Private
- Motto: French: Religion et Patrie ("Religion and Country")
- Established: 1860 as the Collège de Trois-Rivières
- Campus: Urban, park
- Team name: Vert et Or
- Director: Pierre Normand
- Website: www2.ssj.qc.ca

The Séminaire Saint-Joseph de Trois-Rivières (Note: Saint Joseph Seminary of Trois-Rivières) (STR) is a private co-educational secondary school located in Trois-Rivières, Quebec, Canada. Historically a seminary attached to the Diocese of Trois-Rivières, it has been a secular school since 1968.

== History ==
The school was founded in 1860 in Trois-Rivières, Quebec, Canada as the Collège des Trois-Rivières under the patronage of Saint Joseph. As Trois-Rivières had not yet been established as a proper name, the preposition des was used where de is used today.

In 1874, the school was entrusted to the Diocese of Trois-Rivières as the diocesan seminary and was renamed Séminaire Saint-Joseph des Trois-Rivières. The school operated as a classical college under the Quebec educational system until the end of the 1967 school year.

Following the establishment of the Ministère de l'Éducation in 1964, the school adopted a state curriculum and commenced operations as a secondary school in the 1968 academic year.

In 1998, the school became a co-educational school. The school continues to provide a boarding school service for male students.

== Architecture ==
The school building is situated on Laviolette Boulevard. The current school building was constructed in 1929 following the neoclassical style, as the previous building had burnt down in the same year. The building was built around the school chapel.

The structure is mainly consisted of grey Quebec Beauce granite. The facade is dominated by a large bronze dome. The large main doors were designed by the France|French ironwork artist who created the Monument of the Flame in Paris. Like the school arms, above the doors are a statue of Saint Joseph and a mast displaying the flag of Quebec, reflecting the motto Religion et patrie.

== Musée Pierre Boucher ==
Musée Pierre Boucher at Séminaire Saint-Joseph de Trois-Rivières
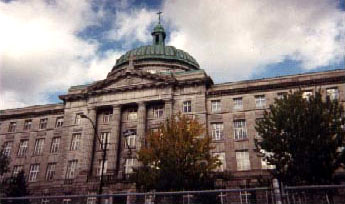
- Location: Séminaire Saint-Joseph de Trois-Rivières Canada.
- Type: religious history
- Website: www2.ssj.qc.ca

The main exposition areas of the Musée Pierre Boucher are found at the very main central entrance of the building. The museum preserves 7,500 works of art of all eras, paintings, drawings, prints, sculptures and fine arts, as well as 13,000 artifacts illustrating the religious history of the diocese, of the city and the region and the life and customs of the 19th and 20th century. The Museum is affiliated with: CMA, CHIN and Virtual Museum of Canada. It is named after Pierre Boucher, an early Canadian settler who studied under and worked with the Jesuit missions in Georgian Bay. Boucher was twice governor of Trois Rivieres, and the first Canadian settler to be ennobled under King Louis XIV.

== Archives ==
The Séminare houses a major service of historical archives, an important gateway to Trois-Rivières and Mauricie history. The Service des archives du Séminaire de Trois-Rivières (ASTR) traces its own origins to 1918, when the authorities of the seminary asked a young priest, Abbot Albert Tessier, to act as archivist.

Since 1929, the mandate of the archives center was broadened to the preservation and diffusion of more than 760 collections of private archives from individuals, families and organizations of the surrounding region. These documents include correspondence, photographs, postal cards and historical notes. They are accessible for free to all citizens.

== Further information ==
It is known under more than one name: the "Séminaire Saint-Joseph", the "Séminaire de Trois-Rivières" and, simply, the "STR". It not only houses the Archives and the Museum, but also a chapel, and a full wing of living quarters for the religious community. It is also well known for setting up a yearly musical school play of professional scope.

Its students are colloquially and affectionately known as les suisses, a reference to the stripes of a former school uniform that made the wearer resemble a chipmunk, or un suisse in Quebec French (notably). Coincidentally, the name suisse was given to the chipmunk (or tamia in international normative French) because of the similarity of their stripes to the striped cloth of the Vatican Swiss Guard uniform.

== Notable alumni ==
- Richard Béliveau - Cancer prevention researcher
- Jean Chrétien - 20th Prime Minister of Canada
- Pierre de Bané - federal cabinet minister and Senator
- Maurice Duplessis - 16th Premier of Quebec
- Gaétan Frigon - Entrepreneur and TV personality
- Gérald Gagnier - bandmaster, composer, and trumpeter
- Gérald Godin - Poet and Parti Québécois MNA
- François Massicotte - Humorist
- Laurent Poliquin - Poet
- Denis Villeneuve - Film director
- Ghyslain Raza - The "Star Wars Kid"

== See also ==
- Trois-Rivières
- Mauricie
- Education in Quebec
