= Lori McCreary =

American film producer

- Born: Antioch, California, U.S.
- Education: University of California, Los Angeles
- Occupation: Film producer
- Known for: CEO and co-founder of Revelations Entertainment

Lori McCreary is an American film producer. She is CEO of the production company Revelations Entertainment, which she co-founded with actor Morgan Freeman.

== Early life ==
McCreary grew up in Antioch, California. She graduated from Antioch High School in 1979.

McCreary graduated from UCLA with a degree in Computer Science in 1984. While in college, she co-founded the legal software company CompuLaw.

== Career ==
McCreary's appreciation for the stage play Bopha! Inspired her to go into motion picture production.

McCreary first met actor Morgan Freeman, who was signed to direct the film adaptation, in Arsenio Hall's office on the Paramount Pictures Lot in 1992.

Later, the pair partnered to form Revelations Entertainment in 1996 with a mission to produce entertainment "that reveals the truth." As Revelations CEO, McCreary produced The Magic of Belle Isle, directed by Rob Reiner. Before that, she produced Invictus, directed by Clint Eastwood, with Freeman starring as Nelson Mandela and co-starring Matt Damon.

She is currently the Executive Producer of CBS's hit series Madam Secretary, which stars Téa Leoni. She is also the Executive producer of The Story of God with Morgan Freeman, the highest-rated series in NatGeo's history, and the expansion series The Story of Us with Morgan Freeman. She was the Executive Producer of Discovery Science's Through the Wormhole with Morgan Freeman.

McCreary's additional producer credits include Mimi Leder's Thick as Thieve with Antonio Banderas and The Maiden Heist starring Christopher Walken, William H. Macy, Marcia Gay Harden and Morgan Freeman. Revelations also co-produced Along Came a Spider for Paramount Pictures.

In July 2005, Revelations Entertainment teamed with Intel to form a new digital entertainment company, ClickStar. ClickStar officially launched its site on December 15, 2006, and it was the first website to make a movie legally (Revelation's 10 Items or Less) available for download while it was still in theaters.

McCreary sits on the Board of the Producers Guild of America (PGA) and, as of June 2014, was elected along with Gary Lucchesi. McCreary still holds this post. She is the Founder of the PGA's Motion Picture Technology Committee and sits on the Producers Council of the PGA and the Technology Committee of the American Society of Cinematographers. She is also a member of The Society of Motion Picture and Television Engineers (SMPTE) and The Institute of Electrical and Electronics Engineers, Inc. (IEEE). In addition, The Hollywood Reporter profiled her in its 100 Most Powerful Women in Hollywood issue.

== Filmography ==
- Rode to Ruin (TBA)
- In Our Blood (2024)
- The Killing of Kenneth Chamberlain (2019)
- Madam Secretary (CBS TV Series 2014–2019) Seasons 1, 2, 3 and 4
- The Story of Us with Morgan Freeman
- The Story of God with Morgan Freeman
- The C Word (2016 film)
- Curiosity: Season 1, Episode 5 - Is There a Parallel Universe? (4 Sep. 2011)
- Through The Wormhole with Morgan Freeman (Discovery Science Channel TV Series 2010-2015) Seasons 1 to Season 6
- 2012 Image Control Assessment Series (2012)
- Stem Cell Universe with Stephen Hawking (2014) (TV)
- "Man vs. the Universe" (2014)
- 57 Seconds (2023)
- 5 Flights Up (2014)
- The Magic of Belle Isle (2012) (completed) (producer)
- Invictus (2009) (completed) (producer)
- The Maiden Heist (2008) (completed) (producer)
- Thick as Thieves (2008) (completed) (producer)
- Feast of Love (2007) (completed) (executive producer)
- The Contract (2006)
- Levity (2003) (executive producer)
- 10 Items or Less (2006) (producer)
- Along Came a Spider (2001) (company credit)
- Under Suspicion (2000) (producer) (credited as Lori Mccreary)
- Mutiny (1999) (TV) (executive producer)
- Bopha! (1993) (co-producer)
