= Steven Klein (producer) =

American film producer

- Born: Boston, Massachusetts, U.S.
- Education: BA in Theater
- Alma mater: Yale University
- Occupations: Actor; producer
- Years active: 1996–present
- Organization(s): Firefly Theater & Films
- Website: www.fireflyinc.com

Steven Klein is an American film, television, and theater actor and producer. He is the founder of Firefly Theater & Films, a Los Angeles–based production company. The company has staged a number of productions, including works by Itamar Moses, Jane Martin, and Geraldine Hughes. Through Firefly, Klein has also produced several films including Finders Keepers, Print the Legend, and Emmy-nominated Wrestle. As an actor, he has appeared in various stage, film, and television roles including in An Infinite Ache, The Circle, Burn Notice, and In Our Blood.

== Early life and education ==
Steven Klein was born in Boston and grew up in Brookline, Massachusetts. He attended Yale University, where he founded and ran the Yale Undergraduate Shakespeare Company. He acted in a number of productions at Yale including The Tempest, which was directed by fellow Yale alumnus and future collaborator, Matt Shakman. Klein also received training at Kristin Linklater's Shakespeare & Company in Massachusetts. He graduated from Yale in 1998, with a BA in Theater.

== Career ==
Klein founded Firefly Theater in 1996. Matt Shakman also played a role in the foundation of Firefly, which operated as a theatre collective staging experimental projects in its early days. Klein's first major Los Angeles stage appearance came in a March 2000 production of Mark Ravenhill's Shopping and Fucking at the Celebration Theatre. In August 2000, Klein's Firefly Theater company staged a production of Shakespeare's Measure for Measure at the Black Dahlia Theatre, a Los Angeles playhouse and companion theatre company set up by Shakman and Klein. Klein would go on to serve as staff producer and recurring actor at the Black Dahlia in the following years. One of the early works he produced and acted in at the Black Dahlia was Austin Pendleton's Orson's Shadow in April 2001.

Also in 2001, Klein co-created with producer Bruce Cohen a short film collective called CATME. In 2003, Klein was a producer on Geraldine Hughes' one-woman show, Belfast Blues, which premiered at the Black Dahlia Theatre in February of that year. The show went on to stage several other productions produced by Klein including at the Off Broadway Barrow Street Theatre in New York and the Off West End Soho Theatre in London. Klein also had his first television guest role in 2003 on an episode of Star Trek: Enterprise.

In January 2004, he acted in a production of Neil Simon's Biloxi Blues at the Walnut Street Theatre in Philadelphia. In September 2004, Klein produced and starred in David Schulner's An Infinite Ache alongside Suzy Nakamura at the Black Dahlia Theatre. He later returned to Philadelphia's Walnut Street Theatre to reprise his role in a separate production of the play in 2007. He continued producing and acting in several Firefly co-productions, including Jane Martin's Flags (2007) off-Broadway at 59E59 and Itamar Moses' The Four of Us (2008) at the Elephant Theatre Lab.

In 2010, Klein appeared on an episode of Burn Notice. Also that year, his Firefly Theater outfit expanded into film production, and its name was changed to Firefly Theater & Films. Firefly's first film was a 2011 documentary feature about aspiring teenage magicians called Make Believe, which won the documentary award at the LA Film Festival. In 2011, Klein co-created (with Jordana Mollick) the annual Unscreened event in which screenwriters, directors, and actors would stage a series of short plays using scripts that were often initially intended for film or television. The series ran until 2015 and featured actors like Lindsey Kraft, Jerrika Hinton, Tig Notaro, Nate Corddry, Maria Thayer, and Klein himself in plays penned by writers like James Ponsoldt, Aisha Muharrar, and Dahvi Waller.

In 2014, Klein was a producer on the 3D printing documentary Print the Legend, which premiered on Netflix in September of that year. The following year, he served as executive producer on another documentary, Finders Keepers, which premiered at Sundance. Through Firefly, he has also produced several other documentaries, including Out of Omaha (2018), and Wrestle (which was distributed by Oscilloscope and premiered on PBS' Independent Lens in 2019) which was nominated for an Emmy. In 2017, he produced and acted in the Los Angeles premiere of Christopher Chen's Caught at an art gallery in Los Angeles. The event, which was described as both an art installation and a theater piece, was a co-production between Firefly, VS. Theater Company, and Think Tank Gallery. In 2020, Klein co-created, produced, and starred in a television pilot for a comedy series called Everyone Together. It went on to win the award for best comedy pilot at SeriesFest that year.

Since 2022, Steven has served as the founding director in charge of Lobby Theatre, a nonprofit theatre founded in residence at and in collaboration with AGBO, Joe Russo and Anthony Russo's production company. As an actor, Steven appeared in their staged readings like Dance Nation, by Clare Barron, in 2024 and The Antipodes created by Annie Baker in 2025.

Steven is a writer and producer of and a lead actor in the film In Our Blood, starred Brittany O'Grady, which is being released by Utopia in 2025.

Steven is also producing - along with Bruce Cohne and Daryl Roth - a new stage musical based on his documentary Make Believe to be directed by Neil Patrick Harris.

== Credits ==
=== Film and television ===
Year	Title	Role	Notes
2003	Star Trek: Enterprise	Draysik	Episode 3.9: "North Star"
2006	Pizza Time	French Gunderson	Unaired TV pilot; also producer
2006	The Problem with Percival	Non-actor role	Short film; producer
2006	No. 6	Non-actor role	Short film; producer
2007	First.	Card player	Short film
2007	The Grand Design	Doug	Short film; producer
2008	The Skyjacker	Walter Neese	
2008	Sons of Anarchy	Manager	Episode 1.2: "Seeds"
2010	Burn Notice	Alexi	Episode 4.7: "Past & Future Tense"
2011	Make Believe	Non-actor role	Documentary; producer
2011	Nature	Bob	
2013	Problem of Evil	Ezra	
2014	Print the Legend	Non-actor role	Netflix documentary; producer and writer
2015	Finders Keepers	Non-actor role	Documentary; executive producer
2015	White Collar Stoners	Jean-Paul Smith	
2017	Kensho at the Bedfellow	Max	
2017	The Circle	Man from the Crowd	
2018	Wrestle	Non-actor role	Documentary (premiered on PBS' Independent Lens); producer and writer
2018	Out of Omaha	Non-actor role	Documentary; producer and writer
2018	The Chair	Non-actor role	Short film
2020	Everyone Together	Martin	TV pilot; co-creator, producer, and writer
2024	In Our Blood	Isaac Kozlov	Also Producer and Story-By

=== Theater ===
Year	Title	Role	Venue	Notes
2000	Shopping and Fucking	Gary	Celebration Theatre (Los Angeles)	
2000	Measure for Measure	Gentleman	Black Dahlia Theatre (Los Angeles)	Producer
2001	Orson's Shadow	Sean	Black Dahlia Theatre	Also producer
2002	Ragged Time	Yellow Kid	Black Dahlia Theatre	Also producer
2003	Belfast Blues	Non-actor role	Firefly Theater & Films Black Dahlia Theatre (2003); Soho Theatre (2004); Barrow Street Theatre (2010)	Producer; Off West End (2004), Off Broadway (2010)
2004	Biloxi Blues	Arnold Epstein	Walnut Street Theatre (Philadelphia)	
2004	An Infinite Ache	Charles	Black Dahlia Theatre; Walnut Street Theatre (2007)	Also producer
2007	Flags	Chaplain	Firefly Theater & Films; 59E59 Theater	Also producer
2008	The Four of Us	David	Firefly Theater & Films Elephant Theatre Lab (Los Angeles)	Also producer
2011–2015	Unscreened	Various roles	Various	Annual short play series; co-creator and producer
2014	Completeness	Elliott	Firefly Theater & Films VS. Theatre (Los Angeles)	Also producer
2017	Caught	Bob	Firefly Theater & Films Think Tank Gallery (Los Angeles)	Also producer
2024	Dance Nation	Luke	Lobby Theatre at AGBO (staged reading)	Also producer
2025	The Antipodes	Josh	Lobby Theatre at AGBO (staged reading)	Also producer

== Awards & Nominations ==
2001: Production of the Year Award, LADCC, Ensemble & Production Garland Awards, For Orsons' Shadow.

2004: Best Actor Nominee, Ticketholder Awards, Maddy Award for Production of the Year, For An Infinite Ache.

2008: Honorable Mention, Best Actor, Ticketholder Awards, Maddy Award for Performance, Garland Award for Performance, For The Four of Us.

2015: Best Actor in a Leading Role, Scenie Awards, Top 10 Productions of 2015, Ticketholder Awards, Outstanding Comedy of the Year, For Completes.

2019: Audience Award at the DocNYC, Audience Award at the Omaha Film Festival, For Out of Omaha.

2020: Best Comedy Pilot at Series Fest, For Everyone Together.

2020: nominated for an Emmy for Outstanding Social Issue Documentary, nominated for an Emmy for Outstanding Documentary Editing, Top 5 Documentaries of the Year, National Board of Review, won Best Sports Documentary at the Hot Springs Film Festival, Best Documentary at the Denver Film Festival, For Wrestle.
