= Thick as Thieves (2009 film) =

2009 film by Mimi Leder

- DVD cover
- Directed by: Mimi Leder
- Written by: Ted Humphrey
- Produced by: Randall Emmett; Danny Lerner; Lori McCreary; Les Weldon
- Starring: Morgan Freeman; Antonio Banderas; Radha Mitchell; Tom Hardy; Marcel Iureș
- Cinematography: Julio Macat
- Edited by: Martin Nicholson
- Music by: Atli Örvarsson
- Production companies: Millennium Films; Emmett/Furla Films; Revelations Entertainment; Grosvenor Park Productions; Equity Pictures
- Distributed by: First Look International
- Release date: April 17, 2009
- Running time: 104 minutes
- Countries: United States; Germany
- Language: English
- Budget: $25 million

Thick as Thieves (also known as The Code) is a 2009 American-German heist action thriller film directed by Mimi Leder and written by Ted Humphrey. It stars Morgan Freeman and Antonio Banderas as thieves who pull off the heist in order to pay the former's debt to the Russian mafia; alongside Radha Mitchell, Robert Forster, Rade Šerbedžija, and Marcel Iureş. The film was released direct-to-DVD on April 17, 2009, in the United States and on October 18, 2010, in Germany.

== Plot ==
In New York, veteran thief Keith Ripley recruits younger crook Gabriel Martin to help him pull off one final job in order to repay his debt to the Russian mafia, who had killed his previous partner, Victor Korolenko, before they could complete the plan. Martin is unsure of Ripley, but Ripley's goddaughter, Alexandra Korolenko, who is Victor's daughter, convinces him otherwise, although Ripley does not like that the two are getting close. Ripley tells Martin the plan, that they are going to steal from a Russian museum that has been smuggling Russian treasures into the country and bribing the NYPD with large donations and expensive equipment. The two infiltrate a party at the museum posing as cops, with Ripley as Lt. Weber, who has a vendetta against Ripley, to gather information about their vault.

The Russian mob, led by Nicky Petrovitch, grow impatient and kidnap Alexandra, telling Ripley he must steal two Fabergé eggs from the Russian Museum in order to get her back. When the duo get into the vaults of the museum with the eggs, Martin reveals he is an undercover cop from Miami planted by Weber to catch Ripley, leaves Ripley locked in the vault and informs Weber, while taking the eggs to the Russian mobster to free Alexandra. After Alexandra is released, Martin is forced to meet with Petrovitch, who reveals that the eggs they have stolen are made of wood. Meanwhile, Weber and his squad enter the museum, but are detained by the security guards due to Martin telling the guards he was a cop as he escaped.

Martin reports in to the police the next morning, after the police have picked up Petrovitch, only to learn that the man they have in custody is not the man Martin met, and that the man he met was actually Victor Korolenko, who had faked his death with Ripley's help. It is then revealed that Ripley had escaped, letting the museum know cops were on the way and that they had cleaned out the vault of all the smuggled items (which had included the eggs) before the police could inspect it, meaning there was no evidence that anything had been stolen and that Martin's testimony would be worthless as his actions have been kept off the book to prevent Ripley from finding out. Martin's involvement with Alex compromises him, and Ripley had to be let go.

Ripley later calls Martin from an airport tarmac, ready to leave with Victor to meet with a buyer for the eggs; to tell him that they knew Martin was a cop from the beginning. Martin later meets up with Alex, who remained in New York, and who confesses that her feelings for him are real. Martin decides to become a thief.

== Cast ==
- Morgan Freeman as Keith Ripley
- Antonio Banderas as Gabriel Martin
- Radha Mitchell as Alexandra Korolenko
- Robert Forster as Lt. Samuel Weber
- Rade Šerbedžija as Nicky Petrovitch / Viktor Korolenko
- Marcel Iureş as Vitaly Zykov
- Tom Hardy as Det. Michaels
- Corey Johnson as Det. Voutiritas
- Asen Blatechki as Russian Gangster
- Marianna Stanicheva as Madame Irina
- Vladimir Kolev as Andrei
- Stefan Shterev as Georgi
- Constantine Gregory as Boris Sergeev

== Reception ==
On Rotten Tomatoes, the film has an approval rating of 17% based on reviews from 6 critics.

David Nusair of Reel Film Reviews gave the film 2.5/4 and called it "...a hopelessly uneven endeavor that's consistently buoyed by Freeman's mere presence...".

Dragan Antulov of Draxblog Movie Reviews gave it 3/10 and wrote: "The sadness created by this film could be cured only by its quick descent in well-deserved oblivion." Jason McKiernan at Filmcritic.com called it "sloppy, lazy, and unable to keep up with its own con." David Cornelius at DVDTalk.com wrote: "Don't let the big names fool you: The Code is limp enough a thriller to deserve the direct-to-video treatment it's received."
