= 10 Items or Less (film) =

- Film poster
- Directed by: Brad Silberling
- Written by: Brad Silberling
- Produced by: Julie Lynn; Lori McCreary; Brad Silberling
- Starring: Morgan Freeman; Paz Vega; Kumar Pallana; Jonah Hill
- Cinematography: Phedon Papamichael Jr.
- Edited by: Michael Kahn
- Music by: Antônio Pinto
- Production companies: ClickStar; Revelations Entertainment; Mockingbird Pictures
- Distributed by: THINKFilm
- Release dates: September 11, 2006 (TIFF); December 1, 2006 (United States)
- Running time: 82 minutes
- Country: United States
- Language: English
- Box office: $1.4 million

10 Items or Less is a 2006 American comedy-drama film written and directed by Brad Silberling and starring Morgan Freeman and Paz Vega. Shot in fifteen days, 10 Items or Less made its release as a digital download – the first such release via the Internet – while it was still in theaters.

Through circumstance, two strangers—an actor preparing for an upcoming role and a cashier—drive around Los Angeles together, having a number of conversations about life and exploring the differences and similarities between their worlds.

ClickStar, founded by Morgan Freeman and Lori McCreary, made the film available digitally on December 15, 2006, fourteen days after its theatrical debut. This event was highlighted by the American Film Institute in their AFI Awards 2006 "Moments of Significance".

== Plot ==
A known Hollywood actor, who has not had an acting role in four years, gets recruited for a potential one as a supermarket manager by young filmmaker Packy. He has not agreed to commit to the role, but goes along with the enthusiastic guy to spend an hour studying the inner workings of a Carver City, hispanic supermarket called Archie's Ranch Market.

Expecting to be picked up in an hour by Packy, the actor looks around the supermarket to get a feel for it. He comes across a film he had done with Ashley Judd, with the price marked down, and tries to hide it.

An authoritative cashier's announcement startles the actor, so he moves up to the registers. The woman in the '10 Items or Less' register is who had made the announcement, so he moves up to get a closer look. He makes an admiring comment on her skills.

After she and the other cashier have an altercation, she explains that the other does not have to do any work, as she is sleeping with the manager, so runs a normal register. She, on the other hand, gets stuck with the less desirable '10 Items or Less' aisle, the one everyone chooses, so the register is more worn out.

The actor explains he had hoped to speak to the manager, as he is doing research for a possible film role. Scarlet recognises him from the Ashley Judd film. When Lee, the older assistant manager appears, the method actor shadows him to get a feel for the role. He follows him around, even helps restock a few areas and uses the loudspeaker to commend Scarlet on her work.

Scarlet's shift ends, and as Packy never turned up to collect him, the actor needs a ride. As he has no phone, Scarlet begrudgingly offers to give him a ride home, after she completes some errands.

Scarlet unhappily realises her soon-to-be ex-husband has her car keys, so they have to trudge to his house to get them and her car. On the way, the actor compliments her on her transformation and 'wardrobe change' as they go, and passers-by recognize him.

Arriving at the trailer park, the actor comments on its convenient location in the city. At her ex Bobby's, the other cashier Lorraine is there. Scarlet demands the keys and the money he owes her. The other makes mention of a pregnancy and Scarlet's green card status.

Scarlet's shirt gets torn as she is getting her things from Bobby. Scarlet intentionally backs into Lorraine's car on their way out. Distraught, she says she will have to cancel her later job interview. The actor calms her down, helping her buy a new blouse in Target, which impresses him, as he has not shopped retail in years.

Insisting they continue to focus on her first impression, they go to a car wash. As she gets herself ready inside, he interacts there. As Scarlet is nervous, the actor coaches her on interview technique for the construction company secretary. Doing role play, he gives her the confidence she needs for the interview, but also in herself to move on and not give up.

They both admit that neither have close friends, make '10 Items or Less' lists for favorites and hates. After the actor says he will commit to the acting role, they have arrived to Brentwood, so they part ways with a pact to live, work, look forward and never see each other again.

== Cast ==
- Morgan Freeman as Him
- Paz Vega as Scarlet
- Kumar Pallana as Lee
- Jonah Hill as Packy
- Anne Dudek as Lorraine
- Bobby Cannavale as Bobby
- Jim Parsons as Receptionist at Construction Company

== Production ==
Revelation Entertainment produced the film, and Morgan Freeman served as executive producer. The film was shot in fifteen days, entirely in Carson, California and Brentwood, Los Angeles, California.

== Reception ==
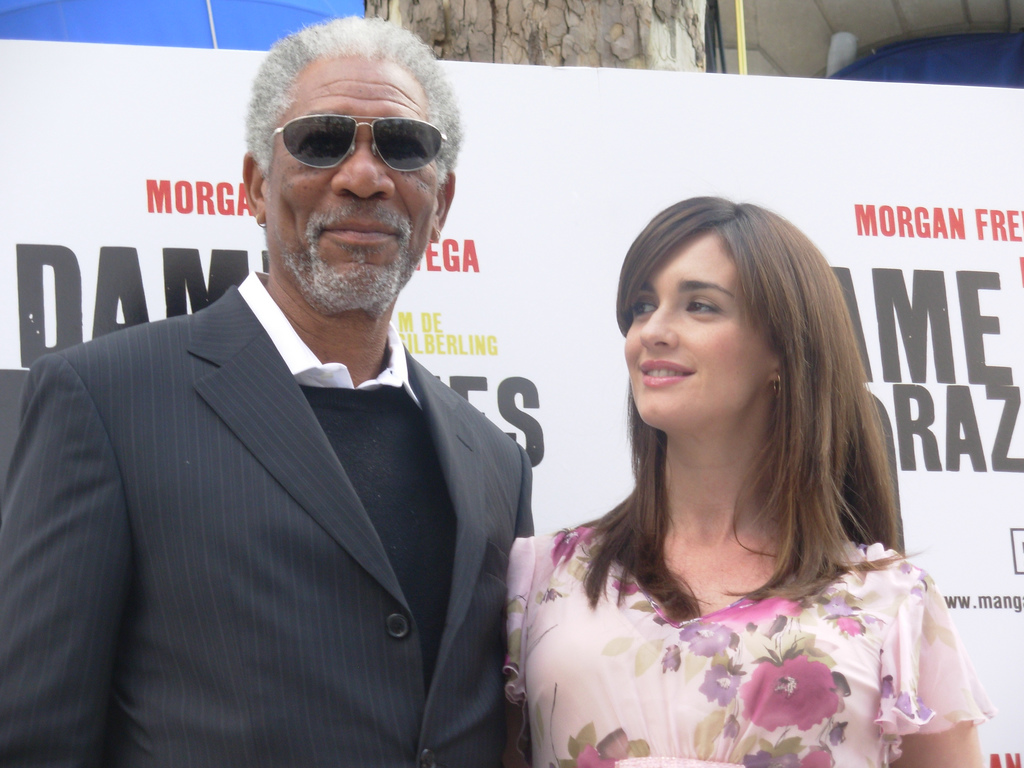
Freeman and Vega presenting the film in Madrid, Spain

=== Box office ===
The film was released in only fifteen theaters, taking in $35,929 in its first weekend. The total domestic box-office take was $83,291. The film was more successful internationally, grossing $1,315,931 at the international box office, with $486,895 grossed in Vega's home country of Spain.

=== Critical response ===
Jonathan Rosenbaum of the Chicago Reader, called the film "A friendly demonstration of how two actors with charisma and a relaxed writer-director (Brad Silberling) can make a nice movie for practically nothing." In contrast, Desson Thomson of The Washington Postwrote the film is "a good-natured but failed experiment in meeting cute -- indie-movie style". Robert Koehler of Variety wrote: " Interplay between a jaunty Freeman as an unemployed movie star and the magnetic Paz Vega as a no-nonsense grocery store checker gives pic humanity and lift."

Critical reaction to the film was mixed, with general praise for the work of the two main actors. On Rotten Tomatoes, the film had a 64% approval rating based on 59 reviews, with an average rating of 6.2/10. The critics consensus reads: "A small film that relies too heavily on the charm of big actors." On Metacritic it has a score of 54% based on reviews from 20 critics.

=== Accolades ===
The film was named one of the "Top Independent Films of 2006" by the National Board of Review.

== Home media ==
The DVD was released in the U.S. on April 24, 2007. It includes audio commentary by Silberling, a featurette on 'the making of', and 6 deleted scenes.

== Soundtrack ==
Although a soundtrack was not officially released, the following songs were included in the film:

1. "Rose" – Martin Blasick
2. "Latin Thugs" – Cypress Hill
3. "Las Isabeles" – Mariachi Sol de Mexico
4. "Cancion Villista" – Ixya Herrera and Xocoyotzin Herrera
5. "Colorin Colorao" – Jesus Alejandro "El Niño"
6. "Las Perlitas" – Mariachi Aguila Real
7. "Con Tu Amor Y Pasion" – Sergio Cardenas
8. "I've Got The World On A String" – Martin Blasick
9. "La Receta" – Kemo the Blaxican (song at car wash)
10. "It's Me Jody" – Herbert Stothart
11. "En Este Varrio" – Delinquent Habits featuring Ozomatli
12. "Al Pasar la Barca" – Paz Vega and Morgan Freeman
13. "Duncan" – Paul Simon
14. "Let The Horn Blow" – Delinquent Habits

== See also ==
- List of American films of 2006
