= Thomas Vitale =

American businessman

Thomas P. Vitale is a film and television writer/producer and network executive. As a cable television network executive, he was Executive Vice President of Programming & Original Movies for Syfy Channel and Chiller Network, where he was responsible for the acquisition and scheduling of all programming, as well as the development and commissioning of original movies and specials, for both networks. As a writer/producer, he has worked on numerous movies and TV shows, most in the sci-fi and horror genres.

== Biography ==
Thomas P. Vitale is a television and film executive, writer, producer, and actor specializing in science fiction, fantasy, and horror/supernatural series and movies. Vitale joined Syfy (then “Sci-Fi Channel”) in 1993 where he rose to the rank of Executive Vice President of Programming & Original Movies for Syfy and Chiller Network, and was responsible for the acquisition and scheduling of all programming, as well as the development and commissioning of original movies, documentary specials, and co-production series, both scripted and reality, for both networks. While at the network, Vitale made Syfy into one of the largest producers of original movies on television when he created Syfy’s original Saturday movie franchise, “The Most Dangerous Night of Television.” The over 350 original movies made during Tom’s tenure include buzzy and unique titles like Mansquito, Ice Twisters, Roger Corman’s Sharktopus, Stan Lee’s Harpies and Lightspeed, and the social media sensations Sharknado and Sharknado 2: The Second One. In the series world at Syfy, Vitale developed, commissioned, and supervised many original shows such as Z Nation, Dark Matter, Flash Gordon, Painkiller Jane, Lexx, the animated comedy Tripping the Rift, and the critically acclaimed Farscape from Jim Henson Productions. Vitale was also responsible for bringing the immensely successful Stargate franchise to Syfy and worked on everything at the network from Battlestar Galactica to Stephen Spielberg Presents Taken to Eureka to Ghost Hunters to Paranormal Witness.

After leaving Syfy and Chiller in 2015, Vitale started his own independent production, distribution, and consulting company, Vital Signs Entertainment, where he has executive produced on the horror anthology series, Slasher, for Netflix and the Shudder streaming service. He was also writer and executive producer on Pandora, an original scripted science fiction series for the CW and Sony International. He was co-writer and producer on the film You Might Be the Killer, the first film ever developed from a Twitter conversation, which played in over 18 film festivals around the world. In 2023, Vitale produced and acted in the film 57 Seconds, starring Morgan Freeman and Josh Hutcherson. 57 Seconds is based on the acclaimed short story by E. C. Tubb, "Lucifer" (also known as "Fallen Angel"). Vitale is also a producer and an interview subject of the documentary 1982: Greatest Geek Year Ever, which premiered at the Sitges Film Festival in Spain and subsequently aired on the CW.

Born and raised in the Bronx, New York, Vitale is a graduate of Williams College in Massachusetts. A member of the Writers Guild of America, Producers Guild of America, and Mensa, Vitale began his career in entertainment in the renowned Page Program at NBC, followed by a stint at Viacom. In 1999, Vitale co-produced an Off-Off-Broadway play, Dyslexic Heart. Vitale sat on the board of the Williams Club for nearly 10 years and remains active in Williams alumni activity. He also served as President of Fieri Manhattan and was the NYS Vice President of Fieri National, an Italian-American service, cultural, and charitable organization.
