= 57 Seconds =

2023 film by Rusty Cundieff

- Theatrical release poster
- Directed by: Rusty Cundieff
- Screenplay by: Macon Blair; Rusty Cundieff
- Based on: "Lucifer" by E.C. Tubb
- Produced by: Griff Furst; Thomas P. Vitale; Lori McCreary; Gary Lucchesi; Petr Jákl; Joshua Harris
- Starring: Josh Hutcherson; Morgan Freeman
- Cinematography: Andrew Strahorn
- Edited by: John Quinn
- Music by: Nathan Furst
- Production companies: R.U. Robot Studios; Highland Film Group; Revelations Entertainment
- Distributed by: The Avenue
- Release date: September 29, 2023
- Running time: 99 minutes
- Country: United States
- Language: English
- Budget: $7.7 million

57 Seconds is a 2023 American science fiction thriller film directed by Rusty Cundieff, written by Cundieff and Macon Blair, and starring Josh Hutcherson and Morgan Freeman. It is based on the short story "Fallen Angel" by E.C. Tubb.

== Plot ==
Franklin Fausti is a tech blogger determined to expose unethical practices in the pharmaceutical industry, particularly those of Sig Thorensen, whose company manufactured Zonastin—a painkiller that led to the addiction and eventual death of Franklin's twin sister, Natalie. In his quest, Franklin secures an interview with visionary tech mogul Anton Burrell, who is on the verge of unveiling a groundbreaking health device called the Tri-Band 5. This wrist-worn gadget utilizes neuro-technology to manage conditions like diabetes, high blood pressure, and addiction without traditional medications. During Burrell's presentation, an armed assailant attempts to attack him, but Franklin intervenes, saving Burrell's life. In the aftermath, Franklin discovers a mysterious ring dropped by Burrell. Upon wearing it, he realizes it allows him to travel 57 seconds back in time. Initially, Franklin exploits the ring for personal gain, such as winning at gambling and pursuing a romantic relationship with his colleague Jala. He soon refocuses on his mission to take down Thorensen. Franklin uses the ring's power to infiltrate Thorensen's company, uncovering evidence of the company's knowledge of Zonastin's harmful effects and its involvement in the death of employee Susan Miller. With the help of his friend Andy, Franklin disseminates this information to the media, exposing Thorensen's crimes. In a desperate attempt to escape justice, Thorensen kidnaps Franklin and attempts to flee by plane. During the escape, the plane malfunctions due to police intervention, leading to a crash. Franklin survives, while Thorensen perishes. After the ordeal, Burrell invites Franklin to join his research team to further develop time-travel technology. Franklin declines, expressing concerns about the ethical implications and potential for addiction associated with manipulating time. He decides to destroy the ring, believing that such power should not be wielded by anyone.

== Cast ==
- Josh Hutcherson as Franklin
- Morgan Freeman as Anton Burrell
- Greg Germann as Sig Thorensen
- Lovie Simone as Jala
- Bevin Bru as Renee Renzler
- Sammi Rotibi as Calvert
- Mark Jacobson as Andy
- Aaron Jay Rome as Skinny Eddie

== Production ==
Filming began in April 2022, in Lafayette, Louisiana.

The Acadiana Advocate reported that Freeman was "writing parts of the script", and had been seen in Lafayette in March 2022, scouting locations for the film.

== Release ==
The film was released in theaters and on digital by The Avenue on September 29, 2023.

== Reception ==
On the review aggregator website Rotten Tomatoes, 13% of 8 critics' reviews are positive, with an average rating of 4.4/10.
