= Madam Secretary (TV series) =

2014 American political drama television series

- Genre: Political drama; Thriller
- Created by: Barbara Hall
- Starring: Téa Leoni; Tim Daly; Patina Miller; Geoffrey Arend; Erich Bergen; Željko Ivanek; Bebe Neuwirth; Wallis Currie-Wood; Kathrine Herzer; Evan Roe; Keith Carradine; Sebastian Arcelus; Sara Ramirez; Kevin Rahm
- Music by: Transcenders
- Country of origin: United States
- Original language: English
- No. of seasons: 6
- No. of episodes: 120 (list of episodes)

Production
- Executive producers: Barbara Hall; Morgan Freeman; Lori McCreary; Tracy Mercer; David Grae
- Producers: Sam Hoffman; Téa Leoni
- Production location: New York City
- Running time: 42–46 minutes
- Production companies: Barbara Hall Productions; Revelations Entertainment; CBS Television Studios

Original release
- Network: CBS
- Release: September 21, 2014 – December 8, 2019

Madam Secretary (titled Madam President for its sixth and final season) is an American political drama television series created by Barbara Hall, with Morgan Freeman and Lori McCreary as executive producers. It stars Téa Leoni as Elizabeth McCord, a former CIA analyst and political science professor who is appointed United States Secretary of State following the suspicious death of her predecessor.

Madam Secretary ran on CBS from September 21, 2014, to December 8, 2019, for a total of 120 episodes.

== Premise ==
The first five seasons of Madam Secretary explore Elizabeth McCord's life as the reluctant but determined United States secretary of state; she drives international diplomacy, battles office politics, and circumvents protocol, if needed, as she navigates global conflicts. The show also focuses on McCord's family and their relationship with her work; she is married and has three children.

At the end of the fifth season, McCord announces her candidacy for President of the United States; as the sixth season begins, the audience learns that she has won the election, and the remainder of the series follows her tenure as the United States' first female president.

== Cast and characters ==
=== Main ===
- Téa Leoni as Elizabeth McCord, the United States secretary of state and later the president of the United States. Elizabeth spent twenty years as an analyst for the CIA before retiring to become a professor of political science at the University of Virginia. She is appointed by President Conrad Dalton- her former boss at the CIA- to replace Secretary of State Vincent Marsh, who died in a plane crash under suspicious circumstances. She later succeeds Dalton as president.
- Tim Daly as Henry McCord, a theology professor and later the first gentleman of the United States. Elizabeth's husband of 25 years, Henry is a former Marine Corps aviator and a veteran of Operation Desert Storm. He is later hired by the National Security Agency, which employs him as an operative in combating religious extremism. At the end of the third season, Henry is appointed as the head of the CIA's Special Activities Division.
- Bebe Neuwirth as Nadine Tolliver (seasons 1–4), Elizabeth's chief of staff. Nadine had a six-year affair with the late Vincent Marsh, beginning when he was a senator from Illinois. Originally suspicious and resentful of McCord, Tolliver soon learns to trust her, and the two cultivate a strong working relationship. In the fourth season, Nadine retires from the State Department to spend time with her family in San Francisco when her son Roman tells her that he is going to have a child.
- Željko Ivanek as Russell Jackson, White House chief of staff to President Dalton (and later President McCord). Jackson's goal of keeping the president politically secure often results in confrontations with McCord due to her unorthodox diplomatic techniques.
- Erich Bergen as Blake Moran, Elizabeth's personal assistant and only staff member that she hired rather than inherited. In the fifth season, McCord fires him, only to eventually rehire him as her new assistant policy advisor.
- Patina Miller as Daisy Grant, Elizabeth's press coordinator. Daisy briefly dates speechwriter Matt Mahoney in the first season; in the third season, she dates "Kevin" from the Bureau of Budget and Planning, who turns out to be an undercover CIA operative investigating the State Department. After he is killed in a weapons-trafficking conspiracy, Daisy learns she is pregnant with his child. In the fourth season, Daisy gives birth to their daughter, Joanna Grant.
- Geoffrey Arend as Matt Mahoney, Elizabeth's speechwriter. Matt briefly dates Daisy in the first season; the two are implied to have rekindled their relationship by the end of the series.
- Wallis Currie-Wood as Stephanie "Stevie" McCord, Elizabeth and Henry's daughter and oldest child. Stevie attended Lovell University and Georgetown University, and later applied to Harvard Law School. She serves as an intern to Russell Jackson, and is briefly engaged to Jareth Glover. In the fourth season, Stevie begins a secret relationship with Dmitri Petrov while he is undercover, placing them both in peril; in the series finale, Stevie and Dmitri marry in a ceremony officiated by former President Dalton.
- Kathrine Herzer as Alison McCord, Elizabeth and Henry's younger daughter and middle child
- Evan Roe as Jason McCord, Elizabeth and Henry's only son and youngest child. Jason is a leftist and self-proclaimed anarchist who is generally critical of his mother's political views but very protective of her personally.
- Keith Carradine as Conrad Dalton (seasons 2–6; recurring season 1), the president of the United States. Conrad served as a second lieutenant in the United States Marine Corps during the Vietnam War and as the director of the Central Intelligence Agency during Elizabeth's tenure at the CIA. In the third season, Dalton is re-elected as an independent candidate after failing to secure his party's nomination, in part due to a controversial policy change championed by Elizabeth. He offers Elizabeth the role of Vice President of the United States during his campaign, but eventually taps Teresa Hurst for the position instead.
- Sebastian Arcelus as Jay Whitman (seasons 3–6; recurring seasons 1–2), Elizabeth's senior policy advisor and later her chief of staff. In the third season, Jay and his wife Abby (Stephanie J. Block) separate because of his punishing work schedule; she retains custody of their daughter Chloe. Jay is promoted to chief of staff in the fourth season; in the fifth season, while stuck at Shannon Airport in Ireland due to a volcanic eruption in Iceland, Jay meets famous Dutch chess player Annelies De Runnow (Marissa Neitling). They develop a mutual attraction after many hours at the airport, and agree to start a long-distance relationship. When Elizabeth decides to run for president, Jay initially passes on the chance to serve as her chief of staff in order to start a life with Annelies, but is later rehired.
- Sara Ramirez as Kat Sandoval (seasons 4–5), Elizabeth's policy advisor and the former chief of staff to the United States ambassador to the United Nations
- Kevin Rahm as Michael "Mike B." Barnow (season 6; recurring seasons 1–5), a sarcastic political consultant and operative who occupies several positions within the Cabinet of the United States. Barnow is a Rhodes scholar who is said to have left a brilliant legal career for a political career that was then cut short by a scandalous divorce. His role as an unofficial advisor to Elizabeth earns him a reputation as her 'hatchet man'; Elizabeth later appoints him as her campaign manager during her presidential run. Following her victory, she appoints him as her White House chief of staff. After her first 100 days in office, Elizabeth asks him to remain as chief of staff, but he refuses and instead chooses to serve as counselor to the president. Mike is rarely seen without his beloved Australian cattle dog Gordon.

=== Recurring ===
- Johanna Day as Ellen Hill, a retired admiral serving as National Security Advisor, before which she was the first female chair of the Joint Chiefs of Staff
- Tony Plana as Ed Parker, an admiral and member of the Joint Chiefs of Staff
- Francis Jue as Ming Chen, Minister of Foreign Affairs of the People's Republic of China and Elizabeth's Chinese counterpart
- Mandy Gonzalez as Lucy Knox, President Dalton's aide
- Mike Pniewski as Gordon Becker, the United States secretary of defense
- Jason Ralph as Harrison Dalton (seasons 1–2), the son of President Dalton and a longtime friend of Stevie McCord. Harrison suffers from drug addiction; in the fourth season, it is revealed that he is back in rehab.
- Matt Meinsen as Matt (seasons 1–5), Elizabeth's lead DSS agent.
- Cotter Smith as Darren Hahn (seasons 1–2), President Dalton's first National Security Advisor.
- Patrick Breen as Andrew Munsey (season 1), the director of the CIA and a protégé of President Dalton.
- Marin Hinkle as Isabelle Barnes (season 1), a CIA analyst and Elizabeth's close friend, who assists the McCords with their investigation into the death of Secretary of State Vincent Marsh.
- Nilaja Sun as Juliet Humphrey (season 1; guest season 3), a former CIA analyst and friend of Elizabeth and Isabelle.
- Usman Ally as Zahed Javani (season 1), Minister of Foreign Affairs of Iran and Elizabeth's Iranian counterpart.
- Dion Graham as Fred Cole (season 1), head agent of the Bureau of Diplomatic Security and Elizabeth's principal bodyguard.
- Josh Hamilton as Arthur Gilroy (season 1), Stevie's 39-year-old employer and boyfriend.
- Anna Deavere Smith as Mary Campbell (season 1), the United States attorney general.
- Yorgo Constantine as Anton Gorev (seasons 1–2), Minister of Foreign Affairs of Russia and Elizabeth's Russian counterpart.
- Clifton Davis as Ephraim Ware (seasons 2–6), the director of National Intelligence.
- Julian Acosta as Craig Sterling (season 2), a former Department of Defense official and rival of Elizabeth's who becomes National Security Advisor in the second season, much to the dismay of both Elizabeth and Russell
- Alex Fernandez as Mark Delgado (season 2), the vice president of the United States
- Angela Gots as Maria Ostrova (season 2), President of Russia and widow of late Russian president Pavel Ostrov
- Leslie Hendrix as Louise Cronenberg (season 2), the United States attorney general
- Jill Hennessy as Jane Fellows (season 2), Henry's Defense Intelligence Agency superior and a member of Murphy Station, the first Hizb-al Shahid task force
- Kobi Libii as Oliver Shaw (season 2; guest season 3), a cybersecurity coordinator. Shaw investigates the cyberattack against Air Force One and becomes romantically involved with Daisy Grant in the second season.
- Chris Petrovski as Dmitri Petrov (seasons 2, 4; guest seasons 3, 5–6), a 24-year-old Russian Army captain who attends the National War College. Dmitri is recruited by Henry McCord on behalf of the Defense Intelligence Agency, and becomes an American spy in exchange for his sister Talia to receive cancer treatment in Stockholm. Dmitri is eventually discovered and captured by the Russians, and is later returned to the United States as part of a prisoner exchange. Dmitri feels abandoned by Henry following his capture, and begins to feel resentful towards him; he is eventually placed into a witness protection program and sent to Phoenix under the alias "Alexander Mehranov". In the fourth season, Dmitri is recruited by the CIA as an analyst; he eventually begins a romantic relationship with Stevie, and the two are married in the series finale.
- Masha King as Talia Petrov, Dmitri's sister who is placed into witness protection alongside her brother
- Carlos Gómez as Jose Campos (seasons 2–3), a Murphy Station (Hizb-al Shahid task force) member. Although his relationship with Henry is initially combative, the two eventually become friends.
- Tonya Pinkins as Susan Thompson (seasons 3–6), assistant secretary for the Bureau of African Affairs and, as of the end of the fifth season, United States Secretary of State under the McCord administration. She serves as a key voice in bringing African issues to Elizabeth's attention, and encourages her to intervene in the Angolan election in the third season.
- J. C. MacKenzie as Sam Evans (season 3), the governor of Pennsylvania and eventual presidential nominee for Dalton's party. Evans is particularly vindictive during the campaign and, following Dalton's victory, threatens to have the vote overturned due to a little-known law he claims Elizabeth broke. He is manipulated into accepting the terms of the vote, however, after Russell Jackson threatens to expose his possession of a gene that makes him likely to develop early-onset Alzheimer's disease.
- René Auberjonois as Walter Novack (seasons 2–6), a State Department analyst with the Bureau of International Security and Nonproliferation
- Christopher O'Shea as Jareth Glover, Stevie's upper-class English fiancé. Jareth gave up a fellowship at Oxford University to be with Stevie after she had trouble adjusting to life in England; the couple eventually breaks up in the fourth season.
- Justine Lupe as Ronnie Baker (seasons 3–6), a United States Army captain seconded from United States Cyber Command who assists Elizabeth on several occasions
- Eric Stoltz as Will Adams, Elizabeth's younger brother and a member of Doctors Without Borders
- Jordan Lage as Kohl, a United States Army general
- Sam Breslin Wright as Dylan Larson, an ex–Army Ranger and CIA operative
- Christine Garver as Molly Reid, a CIA operative who started her career as a field agent in Chechnya. She is pregnant as of the beginning of the fourth season.
- Tracee Chimo as Nina Cummings, Elizabeth's assistant who takes over from Blake after he vacates the position. In the sixth season, she begins working as Russell's assistant at the White House.
- Wentworth Miller as Senator Hanson (season 6), a senator leading the congressional investigation into poll fraud accusations made against Elizabeth's presidential campaign.

=== Presidential cabinets and principal advisors ===
Dalton cabinet
Office	Name	Term
President	Conrad Dalton (Keith Carradine)	2013–2019
Vice President	Mark Delgado (Alex Fernandez)	2013–2017
Teresa Hurst (Jan Maxwell/Jayne Atkinson)	2017–2019
Secretary of State	Vincent Marsh (Brian Stokes Mitchell)	2013–2014
Elizabeth McCord (Téa Leoni)	2014–2019
Susan Thompson (Tonya Pinkins)	2019–2019
Secretary of the Treasury	Max Quinn (Michael Cumpsty)	2013–2014
Secretary of Defense	Gordon Becker (Mike Pniewski)	2013–2019
Attorney General	Mary Campbell (Anna Deavere Smith)	2013–2015
Louise Cronenberg (Leslie Hendrix)	2015–2016
Unknown (shown in "French Revolution")	2016–2017
Hank Nolan (John Bolton)	2017–2019
Director of National Intelligence	Ephraim Ware (Clifton Davis)	2013–2019
Director of the Central Intelligence Agency	Andrew Munsey (Patrick Breen)	2013–2015
Sean Williams (Larry Pine)	2015–2015
Dennis Ellerman (John Doman)	2015–2016
Hugh Haymond (Michael Gaston)	2016–2019
National Security Advisor	Darren Kahn (Cotter Smith)	2013–2015
Craig Sterling (Julian Acosta)	2015–2015
ADM (Ret.) Ellen Hill (Johanna Day)	2016–2019
White House Chief of Staff	Russell Jackson (Željko Ivanek)	2013–2019

McCord cabinet
Office	Name	Term
President	Elizabeth McCord (Téa Leoni)	2019–present
Vice President	Carlos Morejon (José Zúñiga)	2019–present
Secretary of State	Susan Thompson (Tonya Pinkins)	2019–present
Director of National Intelligence	Ephraim Ware (Clifton Davis)	2019–present
National Security Advisor	ADM (Ret.) Ellen Hill (Johanna Day)	2019–present
White House Chief of Staff	Mike Barnow (Kevin Rahm)	2019–2019
Russell Jackson (Željko Ivanek)	2019–2019
Jay Whitman (Sebastian Arcelus)	2019–present

==== Other officials ====
Office	Name	Term
Chief Justice of the United States	Frawley (Morgan Freeman)	2013–present
Deputy Secretary of State	Steven Cushing (William Allen Young)	2013–2019
Assistant Secretary of State for African Affairs	Susan Thompson (Tonya Pinkins)	2014–2019
United States Ambassador to Yemen	Paul Wellington (Tim Guinee)	2013–present
United States Ambassador to Myanmar	Arlen Maxwell (David Rasche)	2013–2016
United States Ambassador to Algeria	Roy Curtis (Dakin Matthews)	2013–2016
Deputy Director of the FBI	Marguerite Sanchez (Roslyn Ruff)	2013–present
Administrator of the National Aeronautics and Space Administration	Glenn (John Pankow)	2013–present
Chairman of the National Transportation Safety Board	Humphrey Nelson (Alfredo Narciso)	2013–present

== Episodes ==
Season	Episodes	Originally released	
Season	Episodes	First released	Last released
1	22	September 21, 2014	May 3, 2015
2	23	October 4, 2015	May 8, 2016
3	23	October 2, 2016	May 21, 2017
4	22	October 8, 2017	May 20, 2018
5	20	October 7, 2018	April 21, 2019
6	10	October 6, 2019	December 8, 2019

== Production ==
=== Development ===
In August 2013, it was announced Madam Secretary was in development at CBS, co-written by Barbara Hall. Madam Secretary is about "the personal and professional life of a maverick female secretary of state, as she drives international diplomacy, wrangles office politics and balances a complex family life." The producers have said the show was partly inspired by the experiences of Hillary Clinton.

Filming primarily took place in New York City, with some external filming in Washington, D.C.

The show's pilot episode was directed by David Semel. On May 9, 2014, Madam Secretary received a series order at CBS. A preview trailer was released on May 14, 2014. Madam Secretary premiered on CBS on September 21, 2014, and on October 27, 2014, CBS picked up the series for a full season of 22 episodes. Madam Secretary was renewed for a sixth season on May 9, 2019. On May 15, 2019, it was announced the sixth season would be the series' final season and would comprise 10 episodes. It premiered on October 6, 2019. Filming for the series was completed on November 13, 2019.

=== Casting ===
In January 2014, the pilot was cast with Téa Leoni as Elizabeth McCord, Tim Daly as Henry McCord, Geoffrey Arend as Matt Mahoney, Patina Miller as press coordinator Daisy Grant, Bebe Neuwirth as Elizabeth's chief of staff Nadine Tolliver, Erich Bergen as Blake Moran, Evan Roe as Elizabeth's son, Jason McCord, Kathrine Herzer as Elizabeth and Henry's daughter Alison McCord, Željko Ivanek as Russell Jackson, and Wallis Currie-Wood as Elizabeth and Henry's older daughter Stephanie "Stevie" McCord.

Bebe Neuwirth left the series after the third episode of the fourth season. Sara Ramirez joined the cast as Kat Sandoval, replacing Bebe Neuwirth as a series regular. Of Ramirez, Hall stated, "She brings a fresh perspective and a fun, energetic quality to the State Department staff."

On August 6, 2019, it was revealed that Ramirez would not return as a regular for the sixth and final season. On September 3, 2019, it was revealed that regulars Arend, Roe, Herzer, Carradine, and Arcelus would also be dropped from the main cast; however, Carradine was expected to make at least one guest appearance, and the others would appear in recurring roles according to their work schedules. Additionally, Kevin Rahm, who had recurred as McCord's advisor Michael "Mike B." Barnow since the second half of the first season, would be upgraded to regular status.

== Reception ==
=== Ratings ===
Viewership and ratings per season of Madam Secretary
Season	Timeslot (ET)	Episodes	First aired		Last aired		TV season	Viewership rank	Avg. viewers (millions)
Season	Timeslot (ET)	Episodes	Date	Viewers (millions)	Date	Viewers (millions)	TV season	Viewership rank	Avg. viewers (millions)
1	Sunday 8:00 p.m.	22	September 21, 2014	14.75	May 3, 2015	9.67	2014–15	10	14.16
2	Sunday 8:00 p.m.	23	October 4, 2015	11.79	May 8, 2016	9.99	2015–16	14	12.39
3	Sunday 9:00 p.m.	23	October 2, 2016	9.20	May 21, 2017	7.44	2016–17	18	10.92
4	Sunday 10:00 p.m.	22	October 8, 2017	7.21	May 20, 2018	6.22	2017–18	37	8.84
5	Sunday 10:00 p.m.	20	October 7, 2018	6.13	April 21, 2019	4.79	2018–19	42	8.12
6	Sunday 10:00 p.m.	10	October 6, 2019	4.77	December 8, 2019	4.53	2019–20	52	6.74

- Note: In seasons four through six during the fall, the series was scheduled to air at 10:30 p.m. ET/9:30 p.m. CT to allow for football and golf overruns (there were no delays from Mountain Time westward). Since its move to the last hour of primetime, this resulted in several new episodes being delayed a week at the last minute due to a game's overrunning, to allow CBS affiliate local newscasts to start as close to 11:00 p.m. ET/ 10:00 p.m. CT as possible; in this case, a repeat aired in the Mountain Time Zone westward instead, with Canadian broadcaster Global following CBS's scheduling in order to take advantage of simsub advertising opportunities.

=== Critical reception ===
Madam Secretary has been met with generally positive reviews from TV critics. On Metacritic, the show has a score of 66 out of 100, based on 31 critics, indicating "generally favorable reviews". On Rotten Tomatoes, the show holds a rating of 67% based on reviews from 52 critics. The site's consensus for the first season reads, "Bolstered by Tea Leoni's strong central performance, Madam Secretary is a solid but unspectacular political drama."

Three former United States secretaries of state were apparent fans of the series. On April 27, 2022, during a eulogy at the memorial service for Madeleine Albright (Secretary of State from 1997 to 2001), Hillary Clinton (secretary of state from 2009 to 2013) disclosed that she, Albright, and Colin Powell (secretary of state from 2001 to 2005), "loved and actually watched" Madam Secretary. All three made a cameo appearance together in the fifth-season premiere of the show, which aired on October 7, 2018.

=== Criticism ===
Three women have served as United States secretary of state to date: Madeleine Albright from 1997 to 2001 under Bill Clinton, Condoleezza Rice from 2005 to 2009 under George W. Bush, and Hillary Clinton from 2009 to 2013 under Barack Obama. Shortly after the series' debut, Fox News asked if the show served as a campaign ad supporting Hillary Clinton, but quoted the Los Angeles Times saying the lead character was "no Hillary knock-off" and a New York publicist calling the casting of a woman "simple business and smart on CBS' behalf." Conservative activist organization Culture and Media Institute said "The connections in the show between Elizabeth and Hillary are clear, from the blond hair to the pantsuits."

When the trailer of the 15th episode of the third season titled "Break in Diplomacy" was released showing McCord responding to unwanted sexual advances by fictional Philippine president Datu Andrada by punching Andrada in the face, the series became controversial in the Philippines. Viewers noticed parallels between Andrada and real-life Philippine president Rodrigo Duterte, who was known for making inappropriate and sexist remarks. The Philippine Embassy in Washington published a statement protesting the negative depiction of the presidential character on its Facebook page.

The fourth-season premiere, "News Cycle", led to a protest from East Timor's minister of state José Ramos-Horta, a Nobel Peace Prize laureate. He said, "It is a slander against a country that only shows ignorance and racism." The show used the border dispute between Australia and East Timor in the Timor Sea as background story. (The dispute is transferred in the TV show to the South China Sea, although neither Australia nor East Timor borders it). East Timor is shown as a country controlled by a Mexican drug cartel and used for the shipment of drugs. Secretary McCord asks China to take measures to prevent the leader of the drug cartel from making a narco-state out of East Timor.

In the fourth episode of the first season, "Just Another Normal Day", the series used stock footage shot in Hoi An, Vietnam, but noted the location as Fuling, China. This caused anger among the Vietnamese government, who said that the episode "offended Vietnam's sovereignty and territorial integrity". Soon after, the Department of Radio, Television and Electronic Information of the Ministry of Information and Communications of Vietnam ordered a ban on the series, and asked Netflix to remove the series from the Vietnamese version of Netflix.

=== Accolades ===
Year	Association	Category	Nominee(s)	Result
2014	TV Guide Award	Favorite New Show	Madam Secretary	Nominated
2015	American Cinema Editors Awards 2015	Best Edited One-Hour Series for Commercial Television	Elena Maganini and Michael D. Ornstein	Nominated
2015	41st People's Choice Awards	Favorite Actress in a New TV Series	Téa Leoni	Nominated
2015	41st People's Choice Awards	Favorite New TV Drama	Madam Secretary	Nominated
2015	Publicists Guild of America	The Maxwell Weinberg Publicists Showmanship Television Award	CBS Television Studio/Madam Secretary	Nominated
2015	Humanitas Prize	60 Minute Network or Syndicated Television	Madam Secretary	Nominated
2016	CBS MVP Awards	Best Motivational Speech	Téa Leoni	Nominated
2016	Humanitas Prize	60 Minute Network or Syndicated Television	Madam Secretary	Nominated
