= Moonlight Mile (film) =

- Theatrical release poster
- Directed by: Brad Silberling
- Written by: Brad Silberling
- Produced by: Brad Silberling; Mark Johnson; Susan Sarandon
- Starring: Jake Gyllenhaal; Dustin Hoffman; Susan Sarandon; Holly Hunter; Ellen Pompeo
- Cinematography: Phedon Papamichael
- Edited by: Lisa Zeno Churgin
- Music by: Mark Isham
- Production companies: Touchstone Pictures; Hyde Park Entertainment; Reveal Entertainment; Gran Via Productions
- Distributed by: Buena Vista Pictures Distribution
- Release dates: September 27, 2002 (Limited); October 4, 2002 (U.S.)
- Running time: 117 minutes
- Country: United States
- Language: English
- Budget: $21 million
- Box office: $10 million

Moonlight Mile is a 2002 American romantic drama film written and directed by Brad Silberling, and starring Jake Gyllenhaal, Dustin Hoffman, Susan Sarandon and Holly Hunter, with Ellen Pompeo and Dabney Coleman in supporting roles. The film was loosely inspired by Silberling's experiences from grieving for his girlfriend, Rebecca Schaeffer, after she was murdered in 1989, as well as his relationship with her parents following her death.

The film takes its name from the Rolling Stones song of the same name. The film's original title was Baby's in Black, then Goodbye Hello, before Moonlight Mile. The film is set in 1972, and music from that era is heavily featured, including that of the Rolling Stones, Van Morrison, Bob Dylan and Elton John.

Moonlight Mile had a limited release on September 27, 2002 before expanding to a wide release on October 4, 2002 by Buena Vista Pictures Distribution. The film received mixed to positive reviews from critics but was a box office bomb, grossing $10 million against a $21 million budget.

== Plot ==
Following the murder of Diana Floss in a restaurant in Cape Ann, Massachusetts, in 1972, her fiancé, Joe Nast, elects to stay with her parents. Her father, Ben, is a realtor whose business partner has recently left. Ben and Joe go into business as Floss & Son, as this was their plan before Diana's death. Joe goes to the post office to retrieve all the invitations that had been sent out for his and Diana's wedding, and, with the help of Bertie Knox, he retrieves seventy-four of seventy-five. She finds the last invitation and takes it to his house later that night. He drops her off at a local bar and returns home, despite her inviting him in for a drink. Joe and Ben attend a local property fair, and Ben pitches the idea of redeveloping a block in the town to developer Mike Mulcahey. Mulcahey agrees, but they need to get all the tenants to agree.

Diana's friends come to look through her possessions, much to the consternation of her mother, Jojo. Her friends take out Joe for a drink at the same bar Bertie went to the previous night. Joe puts "Moonlight Mile" on the jukebox, and Bertie emerges from the restroom to dance with him. Joe convinces Ben to let him talk to the bar's owner to convince them to sell. Feeling trapped at the Floss home, he meets Bertie and tells her about Diana. He confesses to her that he had split up with Diana three days before she was killed. Bertie tells Joe about her boyfriend, the owner of the bar, who is lost in Vietnam.

One night, Joe sneaks out the window to see Bertie again. They sleep together, and he leaves the next morning, slipping back into Diana's house through the window. Jojo is sitting in the room, drinking, knowing he was out seeing another woman, and saddened by the idea that she had always known he would have never ended up with her daughter. She does not want Joe to leave, as they have formed a bond.

Joe goes to dinner at the Mulcaheys', where Mike's wife presumes aloud that Joe was not still "tied up" with thoughts of his fiancée's murder. Joe states that this is not the case, upsetting the mood at the dinner table. Mike calls Ben and ends their deal.

Bertie confronts Joe about what happened between them, and they have an argument, during which he tells her that no one believes her boyfriend is coming home, and that she deserved better anyway. She leaves, upset.

The family attends the trial of Diana's murderer. However, the murderer's wife elicits sympathy from the jury, and the prosecutor, Mona Camp, asks Joe to testify to help the jury gain sympathy for Diana. On the witness stand, Joe confesses that he and Diana had broken up prior to her death, and that he had not told her parents. Ben and Jojo are happy with the confession, and gain closure. Joe writes a symbolic 75 letters expressing his newfound clarity about what course his life ought to take, as well as his love for Bertie, and he places them in mailboxes around town, hoping one will get to her.

Ben closes the shop, Jojo resumes her writing career, Bertie sells the bar, and she and Joe leave town.

== Cast ==
- Jake Gyllenhaal as Joe Nast
- Dustin Hoffman as Ben Floss
- Susan Sarandon as Jojo Floss
- Ellen Pompeo as Bertie Knox
- Holly Hunter as Mona Camp
- Allan Corduner as Stan Michaels
- Richard T. Jones as Ty
- Dabney Coleman as Mike Mulcahey
- Gordon Clapp as Tanner
- Aleksia Landeau as Cheryl
- Mary Ellen Trainor as Mrs. Meyerson
- Lenny Clarke as Gordy
- Paul Perri as Public Defender
- Careena Melia as Diana Floss
- Roxanne Hart as June Mulcahey
- Lisa Anne Hillman as Jillian Mulcahey
- Richard Fancy as Mr. Meyerson

== Reception ==
=== Box office ===
The film grossed $10,011,050 worldwide, with a $21,000,000 budget.

=== Critical reception ===
Moonlight Mile received mixed-to-positive reviews from critics. The review aggregator Rotten Tomatoes gives the film a 63% approval rating, based on 150 reviews. The site's consensus states: "Though the story feels rather contrived, Moonlight Mile is redeemed by the good performances of its cast." Metacritic, which uses a weighted average, assigned the film a score of 59 out of 100, based on 34 critics, indicating "mixed or average" reviews.

== Soundtrack ==
The Moonlight Mile soundtrack album was released September 24, 2002, by Sony Records.
