= The Story of Us with Morgan Freeman =

- Genre: Documentary
- Narrated by: Morgan Freeman
- Country of origin: United States
- Original language: English
- No. of seasons: 1
- No. of episodes: 6

Production
- Executive producers: Betsy Forhan; Morgan Freeman; Lori McCreary; James Younger; Claudine Magre; Kelly Mendelsohn; Geoffrey Sharp
- Cinematography: Kris Denton; Wes Dorman
- Running time: 60 minutes
- Production company: Revelations Entertainment

Original release
- Network: National Geographic
- Release: October 11 – November 20, 2017

The Story of Us with Morgan Freeman is a documentary television series televised on the National Geographic Channel in 2017. It is hosted and narrated by actor Morgan Freeman. Produced by Revelations Entertainment, the series examines some of the fundamental forces that drive humanity including love, freedom, peace, factionalism, power and rebellion. The thesis of the series is that people have more in common with each other than what divides them. Six episodes in total, the show airs in an hour long format for a total of six hours (including commercials).

National Geographic approved the series in April 2017 and the first episode aired on October 11, 2017, at 9 pm EDT (8 pm central time)

== Episodes ==
No.	Title	Original release date
1	"The March of Freedom"	October 11, 2017
An exploration of the concept of freedom across various cultures and countries. What does it mean to be free?
2	"The Fight for Peace"	October 18, 2017
A look at the cycle of war and peace, violence and harmony. Is war necessary?
3	"The Power of Love"	October 25, 2017
An exploration of love in its many forms and the unexpected places it survives. Can love change the world?
4	"Us and Them"	November 8, 2017
A look at the concept of "us" vs. "them." What drives us to divide?
5	"The Power of Us"	November 15, 2017
A look at democracy and the distribution of power. When the President of the USA makes decisions that affect not just their citizens but people worldwide how can everyone have equal say?
6	"The Rebel Spirit"	November 20, 2017
An attempt to understand how a rebellion can be successful. What does it take to stand up to power and change the world?

== Home media ==
Region 1
DVD title	Season(s)	Aspect ratio	Episode count	Total running time	Release date(s)
Season One	1	16:9	6	270 minutes	January 19, 2018
