= Digiboo =

American movie and tv download service

Digoboo, LLC
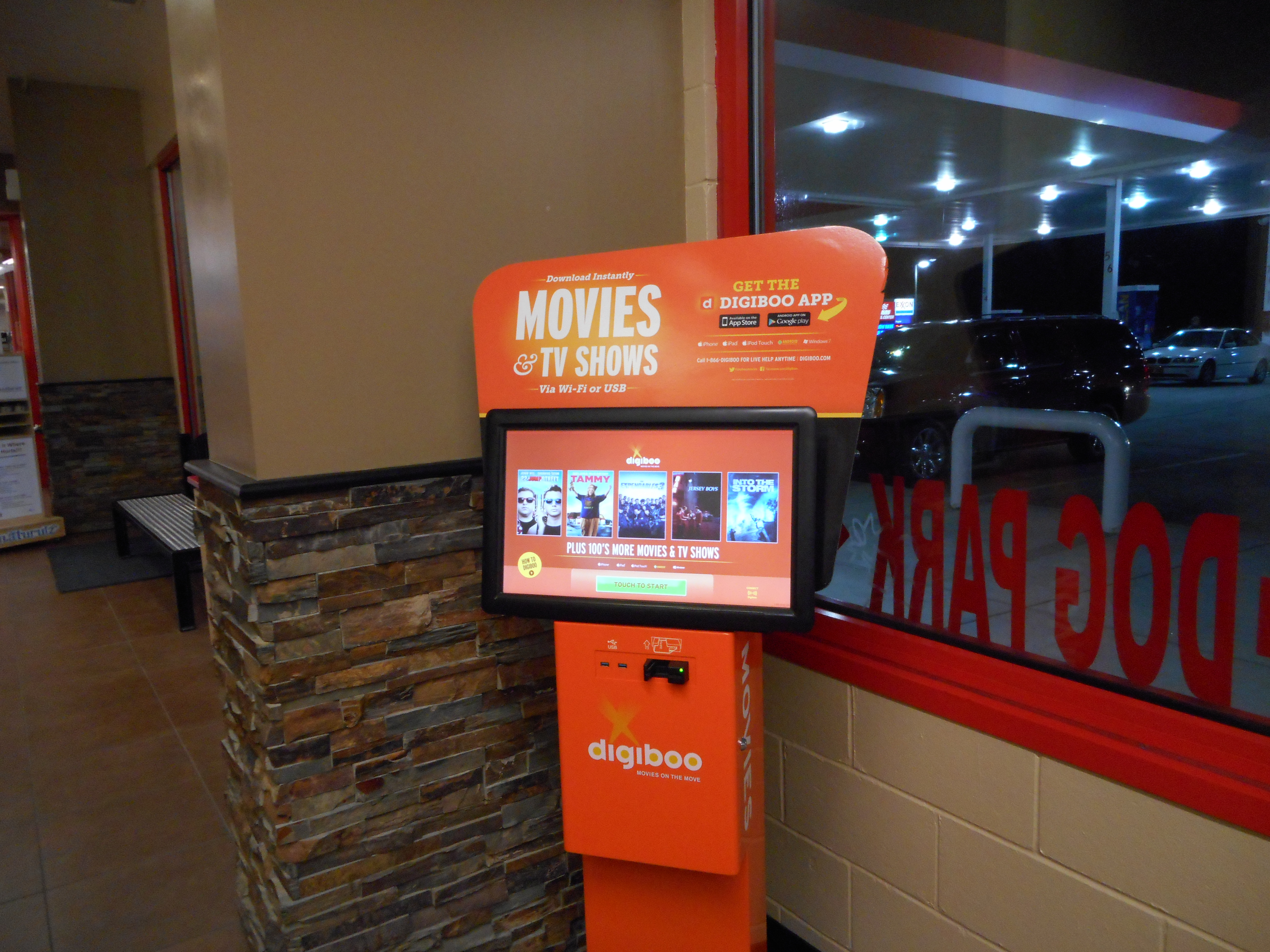
- A Digiboo vending machine at a truck stop in Virginia
- Company type: Digital Movie Distribution
- Industry: Electronic commerce
- Founded: 2009
- Headquarters: Los Angeles, California, United States
- Key people: Richard Cohen (CEO); Lori McCreary (Investor); Morgan Freeman (Investor)
- Products: Movie download and rental
- Revenue: Unknown
- Number of employees: Unknown
- Website: www.digiboo.com

Digiboo LLC, founded in 2009, is a location-based retail download service providing movie and TV show downloads to mobile devices. Kiosks with thousands of movie and TV show titles available on demand, allow the downloading of media direct to phones, laptops and USB 3.0 storage devices, at speeds of 1–3 minutes per full-length movie.
