= Jill Ciment =

American writer (born 1955)

- Born: 1953 (age 72–73); Montreal, Quebec, Canada
- Occupations: Memoirist, novelist, and professor

Jill Ciment (born 1953) is a Canadian-American writer.

== Biography ==
Ciment was born to a Russian Jewish family in Montreal, Quebec, Canada. When she was 10, she and her family immigrated to the United States, settling in Los Angeles, California. She studied art at the California Institute of Arts (CalArts), under John Baldessari. She earned her BFA from CalArts in 1975. She received her MFA in creative writing from the University of California, Irvine in 1981.

Ciment is an emeritus professor of English at the University of Florida in Gainesville, Florida. Her novel, Heroic Measures, was one of titles chosen by Oprah Winfrey's Book Club for 2009 summer reading. The book was also one of the top five finalists for the Los Angeles Times Book Award for 2010. 5 Flights Up, a film adaptation of Heroic Measures starring Morgan Freeman and Diane Keaton, was released in the U.S. on May 8, 2015.

In 1969, she began an affair with her art teacher, Arnold Mesches, when she was 17 and in his class. He was 47, and married with two children. They moved in together the following year, married, and were together until his death in 2016. Her memoir, Half a Life, reflected on their relationship together and was published in 1996. Following Arnold's death and in context of the Me Too movement, she re-examined their almost 50 year relationship with a new memoir, Consent.

== Grants and literary awards ==
- Two New York State Foundation for the Arts Fellowship (1996 and 2002)
- National Endowment for the Arts Fellowship (2005)
- Guggenheim Foundation grant (2006)
- The Janet Heidinger Kafka Prize (2005)
- NEA Japan Fellowship Prize

== Works ==
=== Novels ===
- The Law of Falling Bodies, Poseidon, 1993
- Teeth of the Dog, Crown, 1998
- The Tattoo Artist, Pantheon, 2005
- Heroic Measures, Pantheon, 2009
- Act of God, Pantheon, 2015
- The Hand That Feeds You, (with Amy Hempel) writing as A.J. Rich, Scribner, 2015
- The Body in Question, Pantheon, 2019

=== Short stories ===
Collections:

- Small Claims, Weidenfeld & Nicolson, 1986, collection of 4 (or more) short stories:
  "Self-Portrait with Vanishing Point", "Genetics", "Astronomy", "Money" (novella)

=== Non-fiction ===
- Half a Life, Crown, 1996
- Consent, Pantheon, 2024

== Adaptations ==
- Astronomy (1998), short directed by Susan Rogers, based on short story "Astronomy"
- 5 Flights Up (2014), film directed by Richard Loncraine, based on novel Heroic Measures
