= List of Madam Secretary episodes =

The logo of the series

Madam Secretary is an American political drama television series created by Barbara Hall. It stars Téa Leoni as Elizabeth McCord, an ex-CIA analyst who becomes the United States Secretary of State. Madam Secretary was ordered to series in May 2014, and premiered on September 21, 2014, on CBS.

Madam Secretary was renewed for a sixth and final season in May 2019, which premiered on October 6, 2019. During the course of the series, 120 episodes of Madam Secretary aired over six seasons, between September 21, 2014, and December 8, 2019.

== Series overview ==
Season	Episodes	Originally released	
Season	Episodes	First released	Last released
1	22	September 21, 2014	May 3, 2015
2	23	October 4, 2015	May 8, 2016
3	23	October 2, 2016	May 21, 2017
4	22	October 8, 2017	May 20, 2018
5	20	October 7, 2018	April 21, 2019
6	10	October 6, 2019	December 8, 2019

== Episodes ==
=== Season 1 (2014–15) ===
No. overall	No. in season	Title	Directed by	Written by	Original release date	U.S. viewers (millions)
1	1	"Pilot"	David Semel	Barbara Hall	September 21, 2014	14.75
2	2	"Another Benghazi"	David Semel	Barbara Hall	September 28, 2014	12.72
3	3	"The Operative"	Jeremy Webb	David Grae	October 5, 2014	12.18
4	4	"Just Another Normal Day"	Eric Stoltz	Joan Rater & Tony Phelan	October 12, 2014	11.45
5	5	"Blame Canada"	Eriq La Salle	Paul Redford	October 19, 2014	12.28
6	6	"The Call"	Mark Piznarski	Matt Ward	October 26, 2014	11.71
7	7	"Passage"	Martha Coolidge	Alex Cooley	November 2, 2014	13.21
8	8	"Need to Know"	Dennie Gordon	Alexander Maggio	November 9, 2014	12.54
9	9	"So It Goes"	James Whitmore Jr.	David Grae	November 16, 2014	12.77
10	10	"Collateral Damage"	Eric Stoltz	Matt Ward	November 23, 2014	12.41
11	11	"Game On"	Randy Zisk	Paul Redford	November 30, 2014	13.24
12	12	"Standoff"	Gloria Muzio	Joseph C. Muscat	January 4, 2015	11.69
13	13	"Chains of Command"	Michael Waxman	Alex Cooley	January 11, 2015	12.13
14	14	"Whisper of the Ax"	Eric Stoltz	Barbara Hall	March 1, 2015	11.64
15	15	"The Ninth Circle"	Nicole Rubio	Alexander Maggio	March 8, 2015	10.82
16	16	"Tamerlane"	Jonathan Brown	David Grae	March 15, 2015	11.26
17	17	"Face the Nation"	Rob Greenlea	Matt Ward	March 22, 2015	10.79
18	18	"The Time is at Hand"	Anna Foerster	Joy Gregory	March 29, 2015	11.47
19	19	"Spartan Figures"	Tate Donovan	Lyla Oliver	April 5, 2015	9.27
20	20	"The Necessary Art"	Dennie Gordon	Paul Redford	April 12, 2015	11.39
21	21	"The Kill List"	Ed Ornelas	David Grae	April 26, 2015	10.46
22	22	"There But For the Grace of God"	Eric Stoltz	Barbara Hall	May 3, 2015	9.67

=== Season 2 (2015–16) ===
No. overall	No. in season	Title	Directed by	Written by	Original release date	U.S. viewers (millions)
23	1	"The Show Must Go On"	Morgan Freeman	Barbara Hall	October 4, 2015	11.79
24	2	"The Doability Doctrine"	Eric Stoltz	David Grae	October 11, 2015	11.15
25	3	"The Rusalka"	Dennie Gordon	Matt Ward	October 18, 2015	9.61
26	4	"Waiting for Taleju"	Felix Alcalá	Joy Gregory	October 25, 2015	10.81
27	5	"The Long Shot"	Rob J. Greenlea	Moira Kirland	November 1, 2015	9.47
28	6	"Catch and Release"	Charlotte Brandstrom	Alex Cooley	November 8, 2015	10.59
29	7	"You Say You Want a Revolution"	Tate Donovan	Joan Rater & Tony Phelan	November 15, 2015	10.61
30	8	"Lights Out"	Dennie Gordon	Alexander Maggio	November 22, 2015	9.91
31	9	"Russian Roulette"	Jonathan Brown	Barbara Hall	November 29, 2015	9.96
32	10	"The Greater Good"	Eric Stoltz	David Grae	December 13, 2015	10.14
33	11	"Unity Node"	Jet Wilkinson	Matt Ward	January 10, 2016	8.97
34	12	"The Middle Way"	James Whitmore Jr.	Lyla Oliver	January 17, 2016	11.87
35	13	"Invasive Species"	Tony Phelan	Moira Kirland	January 31, 2016	10.20
36	14	"Left of the Boom"	Rob Greenlea	Joy Gregory	February 14, 2016	10.06
37	15	"Right of the Boom"	Jonathan Brown	Alexander Maggio	February 21, 2016	10.73
38	16	"Hijriyyah"	Charlotte Brandstrom	Alex Cooley	March 6, 2016	10.19
39	17	"Higher Learning"	Heather Cappiello	Kelly Jane Costello	March 20, 2016	9.41
40	18	"On the Clock"	Zetna Fuentes	Barbara Hall and David Grae	March 27, 2016	8.50
41	19	"Desperate Remedies"	Rob Greenlea	Matt Ward	April 10, 2016	9.86
42	20	"Ghost Detainee"	Charlotte Brandstrom	Moira Kirland	April 17, 2016	9.57
43	21	"Connection Lost"	Jonathan Brown	Joy Gregory	April 24, 2016	9.57
44	22	"Render Safe"	Felix Alcala	David Grae	May 1, 2016	9.90
45	23	"Vartius"	Eric Stoltz	Barbara Hall	May 8, 2016	9.99

=== Season 3 (2016–17) ===
No. overall	No. in season	Title	Directed by	Written by	Original release date	U.S. viewers (millions)
46	1	"Sea Change"	Morgan Freeman	Barbara Hall	October 2, 2016	9.20
47	2	"The Linchpin"	Eric Stoltz	David Grae	October 16, 2016	9.10
48	3	"South China Sea"	Rob Greenlea	Matt Ward	October 23, 2016	9.04
49	4	"The Dissent Memo"	Felix Alcala	Joy Gregory	October 30, 2016	7.91
50	5	"The French Revolution"	Jonathan Brown	Moira Kirland	November 6, 2016	8.24
51	6	"The Statement"	Jet Wilkinson	Alex Cooley	November 13, 2016	9.26
52	7	"Tectonic Shift"	Arlene Sanford	Lyla Oliver	November 20, 2016	8.52
53	8	"Breakout Capacity"	James Whitmore Jr.	Alexander Maggio	November 27, 2016	8.97
54	9	"Snap Back"	Sam Hoffman	Shalisha Francis	December 11, 2016	7.82
55	10	"The Race"	Eric Stoltz	David Grae	December 18, 2016	9.05
56	11	"Gift Horse"	Jonathan Brown	Barbara Hall	January 8, 2017	9.00
57	12	"The Detour"	Martha Mitchell	Matt Ward	January 15, 2017	7.54
58	13	"The Beautiful Game"	Felix Alcala	Joy Gregory	January 29, 2017	8.71
59	14	"Labor of Love"	Charlotte Brandstrom	Moira Kirland	March 5, 2017	7.44
60	15	"Break in Diplomacy"	Maggie Greenwald	Lyla Oliver	March 12, 2017	8.23
61	16	"Swept Away"	Felix Alcala	Alex Cooley	March 19, 2017	7.62
62	17	"Convergence"	James Whitmore Jr.	Alexander Maggio	March 26, 2017	8.77
63	18	"Good Bones"	Rob Greenlea	Joy Gregory	April 9, 2017	7.58
64	19	"Global Relief"	Jet Wilkinson	Moira Kirland	April 23, 2017	7.87
65	20	"Extraordinary Hazard"	Charlotte Brandstrom	Mark Steilen	April 30, 2017	7.88
66	21	"The Seventh Floor"	Deborah Reinisch	Matt Ward	May 7, 2017	7.58
67	22	"Revelation"	Jonathan Brown	David Grae	May 14, 2017	7.83
68	23	"Article 5"	Eric Stoltz	Barbara Hall	May 21, 2017	7.44

=== Season 4 (2017–18) ===
No. overall	No. in season	Title	Directed by	Written by	Original release date	U.S. viewers (millions)
69	1	"News Cycle"	Morgan Freeman	Barbara Hall	October 8, 2017	7.21
70	2	"Off the Record"	Eric Stoltz	David Grae	October 15, 2017	6.36
71	3	"The Essentials"	Charlotte Brandstrom	Matt Ward	October 22, 2017	6.43
72	4	"Shutdown"	Felix Alcala	Joy Gregory	October 29, 2017	5.83
73	5	"Persona Non Grata"	John Murray	Alexander Maggio	November 5, 2017	5.92
74	6	"Loophole"	Maggie Greenwald	Moira Kirland	November 12, 2017	6.63
75	7	"North to the Future"	Sunu Gonera	Kristi Korzec	November 19, 2017	5.86
76	8	"The Fourth Estate"	Sam Hoffman	Matt Chester	November 26, 2017	5.82
77	9	"Minefield"	Rob Greenlea	Matt Ward	December 10, 2017	6.45
78	10	"Women Transform the World"	Eric Stoltz	Lyla Oliver	December 17, 2017	5.53
79	11	"Mitya"	Geoffrey Arend	Alexander Maggio	January 7, 2018	6.11
80	12	"Sound and Fury"	Debbie Reinsich	Barbara Hall & David Grae	January 14, 2018	7.25
81	13	"Reading the Signs"	Phil Bertelsen	Moira Kirland	March 11, 2018	6.28
82	14	"Refuge"	Eric Stoltz	Kristi Korzec	March 18, 2018	5.72
83	15	"The Unnamed"	Felix Alcala	Joy Gregory	March 25, 2018	6.14
84	16	"My Funny Valentine"	Rob Greenlea	Matt Ward	April 1, 2018	5.75
85	17	"Phase Two"	Martha Mitchell	Leland Jay Anderson	April 8, 2018	6.19
86	18	"The Friendship Game"	Sam Hoffman	Lyla Oliver	April 22, 2018	6.06
87	19	"Thin Ice"	Felix Alcala	Moira Kirkland & Alexander Maggio	April 29, 2018	6.03
88	20	"The Things We Get to Say"	Sunu Gonera	Joy Gregory	May 6, 2018	5.91
89	21	"Protocol"	Charlotte Brandstrom	Matt Ward	May 13, 2018	5.90
90	22	"Night Watch"	Rob Greenlea	Barbara Hall & David Grae	May 20, 2018	6.22

=== Season 5 (2018–19) ===
No. overall	No. in season	Title	Directed by	Written by	Original release date	U.S. viewers (millions)
91	1	"E Pluribus Unum"	Eric Stoltz	Barbara Hall & David Grae	October 7, 2018	6.13
92	2	"The Chaos Game"	Felix Alcala	Joy Gregory	October 14, 2018	5.48
93	3	"The Magic Rake"	John Murray	Matt Ward	October 21, 2018	5.80
94	4	"Requiem"	Eric Stoltz	Keith Eisner	October 28, 2018	5.56
95	5	"Ghosts"	Rob Greenlea	Lyla Oliver	November 4, 2018	5.23
96	6	"Eyjafjallajökull"	Geoffrey Arend	Alexander Maggio	November 11, 2018	5.10
97	7	"Baby Steps"	Kevin Dowling	Kristi Korzec	November 18, 2018	5.52
98	8	"The Courage to Continue"	Sam Hoffman	Matt Chester	November 25, 2018	5.24
99	9	"Winter Garden"	Eric Stoltz	Joy Gregory	December 9, 2018	5.35
100	10	"Family Separation: Part 1"	Rob Greenlea	Barbara Hall & David Grae	December 23, 2018	6.60
101	11	"Family Separation: Part 2"	Martha Mitchell	Barbara Hall & David Grae	January 6, 2019	5.44
102	12	"Strategic Ambiguity"	Eric Stoltz	Matt Ward	January 13, 2019	6.02
103	13	"Proxy War"	Felix Alcala	Keith Eisner	January 27, 2019	5.38
104	14	"Something Better"	Charlotte Brandstrom	Sara Ray	February 17, 2019	4.99
105	15	"Between the Seats"	Sam Hoffman	Lyla Oliver	March 3, 2019	5.19
106	16	"The New Normal"	Felix Alcala	Alexander Maggio	March 17, 2019	5.43
107	17	"The Common Defense"	Martha Mitchell	Kristi Korzec	March 24, 2019	4.92
108	18	"Ready"	Sunu Gonera	Matt Chester	March 31, 2019	4.99
109	19	"The Great Experiment"	Eric Stoltz	Joy Gregory	April 14, 2019	4.98
110	20	"Better Angels"	John Murray	Matt Ward	April 21, 2019	4.79

=== Season 6 (2019) ===
No. overall	No. in season	Title	Directed by	Written by	Original release date	U.S. viewers (millions)
111	1	"Hail to the Chief"	Eric Stoltz	Barbara Hall & David Grae	October 6, 2019	4.77
112	2	"The Strike Zone"	Felix Alcala	Joy Gregory	October 13, 2019	4.51
113	3	"Killer Robots"	Rob Greenlea	Keith Eisner	October 20, 2019	4.34
114	4	"Valor"	James Whitmore Jr.	Lyla Oliver	October 27, 2019	3.99
115	5	"Daisy"	Rob Greenlea	Alexander Maggio	November 3, 2019	3.82
116	6	"Deepfake"	Leslie Libman	Matt Chester	November 10, 2019	3.90
117	7	"Accountability"	Darnell Martin	Leland Jay Anderson	November 17, 2019	4.14
118	8	"Ships and Countries"	Sam Hoffman	Joy Gregory	November 24, 2019	4.25
119	9	"Carpe Diem"	Felix Alcala	David Grae	December 1, 2019	4.23
120	10	"Leaving the Station"	Eric Stoltz	Barbara Hall	December 8, 2019	4.53

== Ratings ==
Madam Secretary : U.S. viewers per episode (millions)

Season	Episode number																							Average
Season	1	2	3	4	5	6	7	8	9	10	11	12	13	14	15	16	17	18	19	20	21	22	23	Average
1	14.75	12.72	12.18	11.45	12.28	11.71	13.21	12.54	12.77	12.41	13.24	11.69	12.13	11.64	10.82	11.26	10.79	11.47	9.27	11.39	10.46	9.67	–	11.82
2	11.79	11.15	9.61	10.81	9.47	10.59	10.61	9.91	9.96	10.14	8.97	11.87	10.20	10.06	10.73	10.19	9.41	8.50	9.86	9.57	9.57	9.90	9.99	10.10
3	9.20	9.10	9.04	7.91	8.24	9.26	8.52	8.97	7.82	9.05	9.00	7.54	8.71	7.44	8.23	7.62	8.77	7.58	7.87	7.88	7.58	7.83	7.44	8.29
4	7.21	6.36	6.43	5.83	5.92	6.63	5.86	5.82	6.45	5.53	6.11	7.25	6.28	5.72	6.14	5.75	6.19	6.06	6.03	5.91	5.90	6.22	–	6.16
5	6.13	5.48	5.80	5.56	5.23	5.10	5.52	5.24	5.35	6.60	5.44	6.02	5.38	4.99	5.19	5.43	4.92	4.99	4.98	4.79	–			5.41
6	4.77	4.51	4.34	3.99	3.82	3.90	4.14	4.25	4.23	4.53	–													4.25

Audience measurement performed by Nielsen Media Research
