= The Maiden Heist =

2009 film by Peter Hewitt

- Original cover art
- Directed by: Peter Hewitt
- Written by: Michael LeSieur
- Produced by: Bob Yari; Lori McCreary; Rob Paris
- Starring: Morgan Freeman; Christopher Walken; William H. Macy; Marcia Gay Harden
- Cinematography: Ueli Steiger
- Edited by: Carole Kravetz-Aykanian
- Music by: Rupert Gregson-Williams
- Production company: Revelations Entertainment
- Distributed by: Yari Film Group
- Release dates: June 25, 2009 (EIFF); October 27, 2009 (United States)
- Running time: 90 minutes
- Country: United States
- Language: English

The Maiden Heist is a 2009 American crime comedy film directed by Peter Hewitt, written by Michael LeSieur, and starring Morgan Freeman, Christopher Walken, William H. Macy and Marcia Gay Harden.

== Plot ==
Roger is a security guard at an art museum, where he spends a lot of time staring at his favorite painting, The Lonely Maiden, a beautiful woman staring forlornly out into the distance. Despite the fact he has a wife, Rose, he has become rather obsessed with the painting. Rose wants Roger to retire so they can move to Florida. One afternoon, Roger learns that several pieces including The Lonely Maiden are to be permanently moved to another museum in Copenhagen, Denmark. Unable to follow the maiden, Roger falls into despair until he meets Charles, another guard who has a similar attraction to a painting on another floor, a painting of a woman with cats.

George is also obsessed with a piece of art, a nude sculpture of a Greek warrior; he often strips down and poses naked beside it during his night shift. Using the advantages between their shifts and experience, George comes up with the idea to steal their favorite works of art and replace them with replicas. Roger volunteers to tag the artworks being shipped, while Charles and George seek assistance in replicating their favorites. Because Charles is a painter, he's able to do the cat painting perfectly, but he fails in capturing The Lonely Maiden. The men hire a street artist for that task, forcing Roger to steal Rose's Florida vacation savings to pay for the job. Rose becomes suspicious and nearly ends up having Roger taken off the volunteer staff. George manages to replicate "his" sculpture and the Maiden copy is also completed.

On the day of the switch, George sneaks into the warehouse in the crate with the statue. He successfully swaps the three marked pieces, but can't resist stripping down and posing with the statue. A guard shows up, forcing George to hide in the crate without his clothes. The next morning, when Roger and Charlie (with the unwitting accompaniment of Rose) come to collect him, the crate containing George ends up in the wrong van. A panic-stricken Charlie gives chase, and they manage to successfully rescue George, who emerges from the shipping crate unclothed, much to Rose's shock.

Having pulled off the heist without getting caught, they retire from their jobs and Rose is none the wiser. On a trip to Florida, Roger is enthralled by Rose as she looks out over the ocean because she strikingly resembles the Lonely Maiden pose. Their love life is rekindled. Meanwhile, the three men hide their treasures in a shack on Charles' apartment roof so that they can view them at their leisure. However, when Roger looks at the painting, it doesn't inspire him like it once did. He smiles and remembers his wife. Meanwhile, in Copenhagen, a guard on duty passes The Lonely Maiden copy and looks at it, smiling.

== Cast ==
- Morgan Freeman as Charles Peterson
- Christopher Walken as Roger Barlow
- William H. Macy as George McLendon
- Marcia Gay Harden as Rose
- Breckin Meyer as the starving painter
- Wynn Everett as Docent
- Christy Scott Cashman as Assistant Museum Director
- Anthony Cascio as museum guard
- Victoria Cyr as woman walking poodle
- Douglass Bowen Flynn as Danish guard
- Elisangela DiAlencar as museum goer
- Ahmad Harhash as Wassim Khail

== Production ==
It was produced under the working title The Lonely Maiden. It was shot primarily in Boston, Massachusetts, and several scenes were filmed at the Worcester Art Museum, in Worcester, Massachusetts. The painting The Lonely Maiden was created specifically for the film by artist Jeremy Lipking. The cat painting and the Greek sculpture were also created specifically.

== Release ==
The film had a tentative release date of May 29, 2009 before being shelved following the bankruptcy of its distributor, Yari Film Group. It debuted at the Edinburgh International Film Festival June 25, 2009 and was released to DVD on October 27, 2009.
