= 5 Flights Up =

2014 film

- Theatrical release poster
- Directed by: Richard Loncraine
- Written by: Charlie Peters
- Based on: Heroic Measures by Jill Ciment
- Produced by: Curtis Burch; Morgan Freeman; Lori McCreary; Tracy Mercer; Charlie Peters
- Starring: Morgan Freeman; Diane Keaton; Cynthia Nixon
- Cinematography: Jonathan Freeman
- Edited by: Andrew Marcus
- Music by: David Newman
- Production companies: Lascaux Films; Latitude Productions; Revelations Entertainment
- Distributed by: Focus World
- Release dates: September 5, 2014 (TIFF); May 8, 2015 (United States)
- Running time: 92 minutes
- Country: United States
- Language: English
- Box office: $2 million

5 Flights Up (released in the United Kingdom as Ruth & Alex) is a 2014 American comedy-drama film directed by Richard Loncraine, written by Charlie Peters, and starring Morgan Freeman and Diane Keaton. The film is based on the novel Heroic Measures by Jill Ciment. It was released on May 8, 2015 by Focus World.

== Plot ==
Alex and Ruth Carver, an older couple, live in a five-story walk-up in Williamsburg, Brooklyn. They want to move because it is difficult living in a building without an elevator. Alex is a painter and uses one of the rooms as his studio. Ruth is a retired school teacher. They have lived there so many years that it and the neighborhood have become intertwined with their lives. Their niece Lilly is their broker and believes the apartment is worth up to $1 million.

Three other plot lines develop simultaneously with the sale of the apartment. One is the problem with the Carvers' old dog Dorothy who gets a ruptured disc and the issue of how much money to spend to help her. The second is an ongoing news story about a driver of a disabled tanker truck, a supposed terrorist, on the bridge near the Carvers' apartment. The third is the Carvers looking at new apartments.

The vet tells them that an operation costing $10,000 might fix Dorothy's ruptured disk. Alex is against it at first but later agrees with Ruth that they have to do whatever it takes to save Dorothy. After the operation, Dorothy is still unable to move her legs. Toward the end of the movie, while still under the care of the vet, Dorothy starts walking again.

In their search for a replacement apartment, Ruth finds one in Manhattan that she really likes, and their offer is accepted. However, the sellers' agent wants a deposit check that evening or it will go back out to bid. When Alex, Ruth, and Lilly arrive at the apartment to write the deposit, the owners tell them it is not enough. Meanwhile, the news reports that the driver of the tanker has been apprehended. Alex is startled that the driver is "just a kid".

Alex does not like the owners' attitude and refuses to write a deposit check. Alex and Ruth leave. As they are leaving, Lilly finds out that the Carvers are no longer interested in selling their apartment. She flips them off and walks away.

The film ends with Alex walking Dorothy up the stairs to their apartment in the winter. He sees a young couple moving into their building, similar to when he and Ruth first moved in 40 years ago.

== Cast ==
- Morgan Freeman as Alex Carver
  - Korey Jackson as young Alex
- Diane Keaton as Ruth Carver
  - Claire van der Boom as young Ruth
- Carrie Preston as Miriam Carswell
- Miriam Shor as Cool lady
- Cynthia Nixon as Lilly
- James Claude Bristow as Larry
- Joanna P. Adler as Boy's mother
- Alysia Reiner as Blue Leggings
- Josh Pais as Jackson
- Sterling Jerins as Zoe
- Maury Ginsberg as Dr. Kramer
- Jackie Hoffman as the "Eh" Lady

== Production ==
On September 25, 2013, production was still in progress with some scenes being shot outdoor near the Myrtle Ave Subway Station in Brooklyn with both Freeman and Keaton. On September 27–28, Freeman and Keaton filmed a scene at BluePearl Veterinary Partners specialty and emergency hospital for pets in Midtown Manhattan.

== Release ==
5 Flights Up premiered at the 2014 Toronto International Film Festival on September 5, 2014.

=== Critical reception ===
The film received mixed reviews from critics. On Rotten Tomatoes, the film has a rating of 46%, based on 63 reviews, with an average rating of 5.4/10. The site's critical consensus reads, "5 Flights Up is a bit of a narrative fixer-upper, but when it comes to watching Diane Keaton and Morgan Freeman share screen time, you really can't beat the view." On Metacritic, the film has a score of 55 out of 100, based on 18 critics, indicating "mixed or average" reviews.
