= Rode to Ruin =

- Directed by: Michael Keaton
- Written by: R. Dean McCreary
- Produced by: Lori McCreary; Michael Keaton; Kelly Mendelsohn; Gary Lucchesi
- Starring: Michael Keaton; Morgan Freeman
- Production companies: Revelations Entertainment; George & Leona Productions
- Distributed by: Angel Studios
- Country: United States
- Language: English

Rode to Ruin is an upcoming American Western thriller drama film written by R. Dean McCreary, directed by Michael Keaton and starring Keaton and Morgan Freeman.

== Cast ==
- Michael Keaton as Henry Tillman
- Morgan Freeman as Joseph Mulberry
- Laura Linney as Hedda Tessman
- Richard Gadd as Clive McKinney
- Bill Camp
- Ray McKinnon
- Chris Candy
- Travis Hammer
- Thom Rivera
- Derek Hinkey

== Production ==
In September 2026, it was announced that Keaton and Freeman will star in the film, with the former serving as director. That same month, it was announced that Angel Studios acquired worldwide distribution rights to the film. Also that same month, it was announced that Linney was cast in the film.

In October that same year, it was announced that Gadd and several other actors were cast in the film, which was then in production in Santa Fe, New Mexico. In November that same year, it was announced that filming wrapped in Montana.
