= Lorenzo Cohen =

American health researcher and professor

- Born: Lorenzo G Cohen
- Education: Reed College (BA); Uniformed Services University of the Health Sciences (MS); Uniformed Services University of the Health Sciences (PhD)
- Scientific career
- Fields: oncology and integrative medicine
- Workplaces: University of Texas MD Anderson Cancer Center; Fudan University Cancer Hospital

Lorenzo Cohen is a professor in the Department of General Oncology and Behavioral Science and the director of the Integrative Medicine Program at the University of Texas MD Anderson Cancer Center. He is also a distinguished clinical professor at the Fudan University Shanghai Cancer Center in Shanghai, China. Cohen is a founding member and past president of the Society for Integrative Oncology.

Cohen has been involved with numerous studies examining psychosocial and integrative medicine interventions to improve quality of life and outcomes for patients with cancer and other serious diseases, including therapies such as reiki, "energy medicine", acupuncture, and yoga. David Gorski has called the topics of Cohen's research quackery and a waste of taxpayer dollars; he has criticized Cohen for taking a credulous stance on pseudoscience. His directorship of integrative medicine at MD Anderson Cancer Center has been criticized for offering ineffective treatments to patients.

== Education ==
Cohen earned a B.A. degree in psychology from Reed College in 1987. He received an M.S. degree in medical psychology from the Uniformed Services University of the Health Sciences in 1993 having completed a thesis entitled The Effects of Cocaine and Stress on Lymphocyte Proliferation in Rats. Cohen then obtained his Ph.D. degree in medical and clinical psychology from the same school in late 1994 having completed a doctoral thesis entitled The Efficacy of Preparation, Distraction, and Information, on Decreasing the Stress Response. In both cases, his primary advisor was Andrew S. Baum.

== Career ==
Cohen was awarded a Postdoctoral Research Fellowship from the National Cancer Institute of Canada. Since then, he has received continual research support from the National Cancer Institute, National Institutes of Health, United States in the form of R01 funding, with up to four R01's funded at a time. In 2007, he became a Distinguished Clinical Professor of Fudan University Cancer Hospital, where he continues his research on traditional Chinese medicine that started in 2003. In 2007, Cohen earned the International Scientific and Technological Cooperation Award of Shanghai Municipality.

In 2008, the Shanghai Municipal People's Government awarded Cohen the Silver Magnolia Memorial Award and in 2011 the Gold Magnolia Memorial Award, in recognition of outstanding contributions to the city of Shanghai. In 2011, Cohen was recognized by the Society for Integrative Oncology with the Outstanding Achievement Award. Cohen is a Fellow of the Academy of Behavioral Medicine Research.

== Published works ==
Cohen has published extensively in the field of integrative therapies in oncology and beyond.

=== Books ===
- L Cohen, M Markman. Integrative Oncology: Incorporating Complementary Medicine into Conventional Cancer Care. Humana Press: Totowa, NJ, 2008.
- Frenkel M, Cohen L. Integrative Medicine in Oncology: Hematology/Oncology Clinics of North America. 22, 4. Elsevier, Inc.: Philadelphia, 2008.

=== Original reports ===
- Cohen L, Chandwani K, Perkins G, Nagendra HR, Raghurham NV, Spelman A, Nagarathna R, Johnson K, Fortier A, Banu A, Kirschbaum C, Haddad R, Wei Q, Morris S, Scheetz J, and Chaoul A. A randomized, controlled trial of yoga in women with breast cancer undergoing radiotherapy. Journal of Clinical Oncology. In Press.
- Cohen, Lorenzo; Arun, Banu; Dryden, Mark; Le-Petross, Carisa; Dogan, Basak; McKenna, Brian J.; Markman, Maurie; Babiera, Gildy (2010). "External Qigong Therapy for Women With Breast Cancer Prior to Surgery". Integrative Cancer Therapies. 9 (4): 348–353. doi:10.1177/1534735410387424.
- Cohen, L; Parker, PA; Vence, L; Savary, C; Kentor, D; Pettaway, C; Babaian, R; Pisters, L; Miles, B; Wei, Q; Wiltz, L; Patel, T; Radvanyi, L (2011). "Pre-surgical stress management improves post-operative immune function in men with prostate cancer undergoing radical prostatectomy". Psychosom Med. 73 (3): 218–25. doi:10.1097/PSY.0b013e31820a1c26. PMID 21257977.
- Parker, Patricia A.; Pettaway, Curtis A.; Babaian, Richard J.; Pisters, Louis L.; Miles, Brian; Fortier, Adoneca; Wei, Qi; Carr, Danielle D.; Cohen, Lorenzo (2009). "The Effects of a Presurgical Stress Management Intervention for Men with Prostate Cancer Undergoing Radical Prostatectomy". Journal of Clinical Oncology. 27 (19): 3169–3176. doi:10.1200/JCO.2007.16.0036. PMC 2716938. PMID 19349551.
- Cohen, L; Cole, SW; Sood, AK; Prinsloo, S; Kirschbaum, C; Arevalo, JM; Jennings, NB; Scott, S; Vence, L; Wei, Q; Kentor, D; Radvanyi, L; Tannir, N; Jonasch, E; Tamboli, P; Pisters, L (2012). "Depressive symptoms and cortisol rhythmicity predict survival in patients with renal cell carcinoma: role of inflammatory signaling". PLOS ONE. 7 (8) e42324. Bibcode:2012PLoSO...742324C. doi:10.1371/journal.pone.0042324. PMC 3409855. PMID 22870317..

=== Book chapters ===
- Lee RT, Garcia MK, Chaoul MA, Baynham-Fletcher L, Gower L, Cohen L. Integrative Medicine Center. In: Manual of Psycho-Social Oncology. McGraw-Hill Medical: Burr Ridge, 2010.
- Cohen L, Russell N, Garcia MK, Biegler K, Frenkel M. Integrative Oncology. In: Psycho-Oncology, 2. Oxford University Press: New York, 447–454, 2010.
- Cohen L, Russell N, Garcia K, Frenkel M. The Role of Integrative Oncology in Cancer Care. In: Cancer Medicine, 8. People's Medical Publishing House-USA: Shelton, 846–853, 2010.
