= Jeremy Lipking =

American realist painter

- Born: November 2, 1975 (age 50); Santa Monica, California, U.S.
- Education: California Art Institute
- Known for: Painting
- Movement: Contemporary realism
- Website: www.jeremylipking.com

Jeremy Lipking is an American realist painter, born in Santa Monica, California on 2 November 1975.

Lipking was inspired by the figurative tradition of nineteenth century European painters. He was educated at the California Art Institute. Lipking's works include landscapes, still lifes, and human figures. He is widely regarded as one of the top American painters alive today.

His painting, The Lonely Maiden was created specifically for the film, The Maiden Heist and plays a major role in the plot.

In 2026, the Booth Western Art Museum in Cartersville, Georgia, presented Jeremy Lipking – 30 Years a Painter (1996–2026), a retrospective exhibition featuring more than 30 works representing different periods of his career.

== Awards ==
Jeremy Lipking received the following awards:

- 2014: Winner of the Prix de West, for his an oil-on-linen painting Silence and Sagebrush.
- 2014: Winner of the Art Renewal Center Salon.
- 2007: "First Place" Portrait Society of America International Portrait Competition, Washington D.C.
- 2001: Gold Medal and the Museum Director's Award at the California Art Club's 91st Annual Gold Medal Juried Exhibition, for Shady Grove .

etc.
