= Barrie R. Cassileth =

American medical sociologist (1938–2022)

- Born: April 22, 1938; Philadelphia, Pennsylvania, U.S.
- Died: February 26, 2022 (aged 83); Beverly Hills, California, U.S.

Barrie Joyce Rabinowitz Cassileth (née Rabinowitz; April 22, 1938 – February 26, 2022) was an American medical sociologist and researcher of complementary medicine and a critic of alternative medicine. She published extensively on alternative cancer treatments.

== Early life ==
Cassileth was born in Philadelphia on April 22, 1938. Her father, Albert, initially owned a company that made socks, before operating a company that designed and installed custom kitchens together with her mother, Rosalind (Kaizen). Cassileth studied social sciences at Bennington College, graduating with a Bachelor of Arts in 1959. She subsequently obtained a Master of Science in psychology from the Albert Einstein College of Medicine in New York City, after taking a hiatus when her husband was called up for military service. She ultimately resumed her studies and was later awarded a Doctor of Philosophy in medical sociology from the University of Pennsylvania in 1978.

== Career ==
After completing her doctorate, Cassileth remained at the University of Pennsylvania as an assistant professor and taught medical sociology. In that capacity, she contributed to the establishment of one of the first palliative cancer care programs in the US. She then taught at the University of North Carolina, Duke University, and Harvard University. Cassileth edited The Cancer Patient: Social and Medical Aspects of Care, which was published in 1979. She later wrote The Alternative Medicine Handbook (1998) and The Complete Guide to Complementary Therapies in Cancer Care (2011).

Starting in the 1970s, Cassileth championed integrative medicine entailing a "whole-person" method towards medical care. She underscored how this was not intended to supplant traditional treatments, but add to it instead with practices that could reduce stress, alleviate discomfort, and ameliorate quality of life in general. She also conducted a study with colleagues that was published in The New England Journal of Medicine in 1985, which found that a positive or negative attitude maintained by patients with advanced cancer had little impact on the result. She noted how "for every anecdote about a cancer patient with a good attitude who lived, I can give you 200 about those who had good attitudes and died", and attributed survival to an individual's biology. Cassileth also expressed misgivings about licensed medical practitioners counseling their patients to pursue alternative treatments to cancer, and maintained that "there are no viable alternatives to mainstream cancer care". She cited the example of Steve Jobs – who initially put off surgery in favor of alternative medicine – and was of the opinion that he "essentially committed suicide" by not seeking conventional treatment from the outset.

In 1992, she moved to North Carolina to work as a professor of Community and Family Medicine at Duke University. While there, she created the Duke Cancer Report and served as its first editor for its first three years. In addition, she was an adjunct professor of oncology at the University of North Carolina at Chapel Hill.

Cassileth was recruited by Paul Marks of the Memorial Sloan Kettering Cancer Center (MSKCC) in 1999 to establish an integrative care program at the hospital. Under her leadership, the program eventually expanded to approximately 60 staff members with a separate building to work in. While at MSKCC, her work was integral to the creation of evidence-based clinical practice guidelines for integrating complementary therapies with conventional oncology treatment that are still in use today. She later founded the Integrative Medicine Service at the MSKCC and held the Laurance S. Rockefeller Chair in Integrative Medicine. Cassileth also formed the Society for Integrative Oncology in 2003 and served as its inaugural president. She worked at MSKCC until her retirement in 2016.

== Personal life ==
Cassileth married her first husband, Peter Cassileth, in 1958. Together, they had three children: Jodi, Wendy, and Gregory. They eventually divorced. Her second marriage to H. Taylor Vaden also ended in divorce. She later married Richard Cooper in 2008. They remained married until his death in 2016.

== Death ==
Cassileth died aged 83, on February 26, 2022, in an assisted-living facility in Beverly Hills, California. Her daughter, Jodi Cassileth Greenspan, said that she died due to complications of Alzheimer's disease.

== Selected publications ==
=== Papers ===
- Cassileth, Barrie R.; Zupkis, Robert V.; Sutton-Smith, Katherine; March, Vicki (June 1, 1980). "Information and Participation Preferences Among Cancer Patients". Annals of Internal Medicine. 92 (6): 832–836. doi:10.7326/0003-4819-92-6-832. ISSN 0003-4819. PMID 7387025.
- Cassileth, Barrie R.; Lusk, Edward J.; Strouse, Thomas B.; Miller, David S.; Brown, Lorraine L.; Cross, Patricia A.; Tenaglia, Alan N. (August 23, 1984). "Psychosocial Status in Chronic Illness". The New England Journal of Medicine. 311 (8): 506–511. doi:10.1056/nejm198408233110805. PMID 6749208.
- Cassileth, Barrie R.; Lusk, Edward J.; Miller, David S.; Brown, Lorraine L.; Miller, Clifford (June 13, 1985). "Psychosocial Correlates of Survival in Advanced Malignant Disease?". New England Journal of Medicine. 312 (24): 1551–1555. doi:10.1056/NEJM198506133122406. PMID 4000186.
- Cassileth, Barrie R.; Vickers, Andrew J.; Magill, Lucanne A. (December 4, 2003). "Music therapy for mood disturbance during hospitalization for autologous stem cell transplantation". Cancer. 98 (12): 2723–2729. doi:10.1002/cncr.11842. ISSN 0008-543X. PMID 14669295. S2CID 39964209.
- Cassileth, Barrie R.; Deng, Gary (February 1, 2004). "Complementary and Alternative Therapies for Cancer". The Oncologist. 9 (1): 80–89. doi:10.1634/theoncologist.9-1-80. PMID 14755017. S2CID 6453919.
- Vickers, Andrew J.; Kuo, Joyce; Cassileth, Barrie R. (2006). "Unconventional Anticancer Agents: A Systematic Review of Clinical Trials". Journal of Clinical Oncology. 24 (1): 136–40. doi:10.1200/JCO.2005.03.8406. PMC 1472241. PMID 16382123. Archived from the original (w) on February 26, 2009.

=== Books ===
- Cassileth, Barrie (1998). The Alternative Medicine Handbook: The Complete Reference Guide to Alternative and Complementary Therapies. New York: WW Norton. ISBN 978-0-393-31816-6.
- Cassileth, Barrie (2005). PDQ Integrative Oncology: Complementary Therapies in Cancer Care. People's Medicine Publishing House (PMPH USA). ISBN 978-1-550-09280-6.
- Cassileth, Barrie (2010). Herb-Drug Interactions in Oncology. People's Medicine Publishing House (PMPH USA). ISBN 978-1-607-95041-7.
- Cassileth, Barrie (2011). The Complete Guide to Complementary Therapies in Cancer Care: Essential Information for Patients, Survivors and Health Professionals. World Scientific Publishing Company. ISBN 978-9-814-33516-4.
- Cassileth, Barrie (2014). Survivorship: Living Well During and After Cancer. Ann Arbor, MI: Spry Publishing. ISBN 978-1-938-17035-5.
