= Arnold Mesches =

American painter

Arnold Mesches (August 11, 1923 – November 5, 2016) was an American visual artist.

== Bio ==
Arnold Mesches was born in 1923 in the Bronx, New York and was raised in Buffalo, New York. Mesches moved to Los Angeles in 1943 on a scholarship at the Art Center School. In 1945, the FBI opened a file on him, targeting him as a subversive communist. He was inspired to create works during the Republican Senator Joseph McCarthy era of the 1950s. He created many series of "provocative, layered collages composed from his personal FBI file plus news clippings, 1950s magazine cutouts, personal photographs, and hand written scripts." Mesches has explored contemporary social and historical issues, informed by world history and his life during the Depression, which also reflect his art.

Mesches began teaching when his art career went into decline. Married with two children, he had affairs with numerous women. In 1970 he began an affair with Jill Ciment, his seventeen-year-old student, and thirty years his junior. The two moved in together the following year, married after his divorce finalized, and remained so until his death at age 93. Ciment went to become an accomplished novelist and memoirist.

In 1984, he moved to New York City and taught at New York University. He also taught at Parsons College and Rutgers University. He eventually ended up teaching at University of Florida in Gainesville. He has had over 125 solo exhibitions and is represented in places such as the Metropolitan Museum of Arts, the Los Angeles County Museum of Art, the Brooklyn Museum, and the Museum of Modern Art in Sydney, Australia, among others. He died on November 5, 2016, in Gainesville, Florida, at the age of 93.

== Awards ==
- National Endowment of the Arts, 1982
- Pollock-Krasner award, 2002 and 2008
- Art Critics of America, 2004
- Florida State Individual Grant 2007
