= In Our Blood (film) =

2024 American horror film

- Theatrical release poster
- Directed by: Pedro Kos
- Written by: Mallory Westfall
- Produced by: Stuart Fenegan; Steven Klein; Aaron Kogan; Gary Lucchesi; Michael McKay
- Starring: Brittany O'Grady; E. J. Bonilla; Krisha Fairchild; Alanna Ubach
- Cinematography: Camilo Monsalve
- Edited by: Isadora Boschiroli; Fernando Stutz
- Music by: Gil Talmi
- Production companies: Liberty Films; Firefly Theater & Films; Aaron Kogan Productions; Revelations Entertainment
- Distributed by: Utopia
- Release dates: July 31, 2024 (Fantasia); October 24, 2025 (United States)
- Running time: 89 minutes
- Country: United States
- Language: English

In Our Blood is a 2024 American found footage horror thriller film directed by Pedro Kos and written by Mallory Westfall. It stars Brittany O'Grady, E. J. Bonilla, Krisha Fairchild and Alanna Ubach.

In Our Blood had its world premiere at the Fantasia International Film Festival on July 31, 2024, and was released in the United States on October 24, 2025.

== Premise ==
A filmmaker teams up with a cinematographer to shoot a documentary of her reuniting with her mother. Once she suddenly goes missing, the two must piece together clues to find her.

== Cast ==
- Brittany O'Grady as Emily Wyland
- E. J. Bonilla as Danny Martinez
- Krisha Fairchild as Ana Stuart
- Alanna Ubach as Sam Wyland
- Steven Klein as Isaac Kozlov
- Bianca Comparato as Beth Kozlov
- Leo Marks as Red

== Production ==
Duncan Jones and Morgan Freeman serve as executive producers under their Liberty Films and Revelations Entertainment banners, respectively. Principal photography took place in New Mexico.

== Release ==
It had its world premiere at the Fantasia International Film Festival on July 31, 2024. In February 2025, Utopia acquired distribution rights to the film. The film was released on October 24, 2025.

== Reception ==
The film has a 100% rating on Rotten Tomatoes based on 17 reviews. Chase Hutchinson of Collider rated the film an 8 out of 10. Mary Beth McAndrews of Dread Central awarded the film four stars out of five.
