= Society for Integrative Oncology =

American medical professional society

- Abbreviation: SIO
- Founder: Barrie Cassileth
- Type: Professional society
- Legal status: 501(c)(3) organization
- Purpose: Applying integrative medicine to oncology
- President: Ting Bao
- President-elect: Linda Carlson
- Immediate Past President: Lynda Balneaves
- Website: integrativeonc.org

The Society for Integrative Oncology (abbreviated SIO) is a multidisciplinary professional society dedicated to studying how to apply evidence-based integrative medicine to the treatment of cancer. It was established in 2003 and is a 501(c)(3) nonprofit organization. The founding president of the SIO was Barrie Cassileth, and in October 2013, Heather Greenlee of Columbia University was named president. Since the SIO's November 2015 meeting, its president has been Jun Mao of the Memorial Sloan Kettering Cancer Center. Each fall, beginning in 2004, the SIO has held an international conference. From 2003 to 2010, the SIO published a peer-reviewed journal: from 2003 to 2005, it was entitled the Journal of Cancer Integrative Medicine, after which it was renamed the Journal of the Society for Integrative Oncology.
