= Mutiny (1999 film) =

- Written by: James Henerson
- Directed by: Kevin Hooks
- Starring: James B. Sikking; Michael Jai White; Duane Martin; David Ramsey; Matthew Glave; David Barry Gray; Joe Morton
- Theme music composer: Lee Holdridge
- Country of origin: United States
- Original language: English

Production
- Producers: Steven Rosenfeld; Anthony Santa Croce
- Cinematography: Ron Garcia
- Editor: Stephen Lovejoy
- Running time: 99 minutes
- Production companies: Big Productions; Revelations Entertainment

Original release
- Network: NBC
- Release: March 28, 1999

Mutiny is a 1999 television drama film based on the story of the Port Chicago disaster during World War II where 50 African-American sailors were accused of mutiny because they declined to continue loading munitions after an explosion caused by failures in training and management.

== Plot ==
The film fairly closely follows the timeline of actual events as set out in the Port Chicago disaster article.

== Cast ==
- James B. Sikking as Lieutenant Commander Tynan
- Michael Jai White as Ben Cooper
- Duane Martin as B. J. Teach
- David Ramsey as Vernon Nettles
- Matthew Glave as Lieutenant Kirby
- David Barry Gray as Ensign Norris
- Joe Morton as Thurgood Marshall

== Reception ==
The Movie Scene gave the film 3 out of 5 stars, saying that the story behind the film needs to be told, but that "an 89 minute TV movie is not the way to do it justice". He found the atmosphere lacking and the minor characters distracting from the main plot line. Diane Selkirk for Apollo Movie Guide gave the film a score of 70/100, writing that "the movie does flow well and the story comes across clearly, but it just seems weaker than you'd expect." She questioned the decision to not base any of the film's characters on actual people. She echoed The Movie Scene's sentiment that a documentary or theatrical film would be a better format to tell the story of the Port Chicago disaster.

The film was nominated for the Outstanding Music Composition for a Miniseries or a Movie Emmy at the 51st Primetime Emmy Awards.
