= ClickStar =

Movie distribution company

ClickStar, Inc.
- Company type: Broadband Movie Distribution
- Industry: Electronic commerce
- Founded: 2005
- Defunct: 2008
- Headquarters: Santa Monica, California, United States
- Key people: Lori McCreary, Co-Founder, Chairman & CEO, Morgan Freeman, Co-Founder
- Products: Online movie download and rental
- Revenue: Unknown
- Number of employees: Unknown
- Website: www.cstar.com (defunct)

ClickStar was a broadband movie distribution company founded by actor Morgan Freeman and film producer Lori McCreary of Revelations Entertainment. ClickStar launched on December 15, 2006 under the leadership of interim CEO James J. Ackerman and Chairman/Co-Founder Lori McCreary. The company is no longer in operation.

In 2006 ClickStar became the first company in motion picture history to offer a legitimate motion picture download, 10 Items or Less, while the film was still playing in theaters. ClickStar was highlighted by the American Film Institute in their AFI Awards 2006 "Moments of Significance" for this achievement.
