= Richard Béliveau =

Canadian neuroscientist

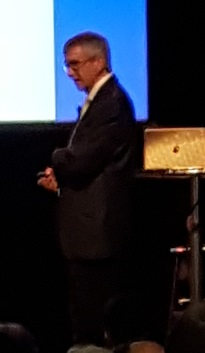
Richard Béliveau

Richard Béliveau (born 1953 in Trois-Rivières, Quebec) is currently the director of the Molecular Medicine Laboratory and a researcher in the Department of Neurosurgery at Notre-Dame Hospital. Additionally, he holds the Claude-Bertrand Chair in Neurosurgery at the Centre hospitalier de l'Université de Montréal.

== Education ==
In 1976, Béliveau obtained his Bachelor of Science in molecular biology from the Université du Québec à Trois-Rivières. He pursued his quest for knowledge at the Université Laval where he completed his Doctor of Philosophy in biochemistry in 1980. From 1980 to 1981, he was a post-doctoral fellow at Cornell University. Béliveau was finally a research fellow at the Université de Montréal from 1982 to 1984. During those years, he also taught as an assistant professor in the university's Department of Pediatrics.

== Publications ==
Béliveau wrote several books on subjects closely related to health. In 2005, he published his first book entitled Les aliments contre le cancer, and one year later, his second book, Cuisiner avec les aliments contre le cancer, began selling in bookstores across the province. In January 2009, he publicly issued La Santé par le plaisir de bien manger, which was followed by his most recent publication, in September 2010, of La Mort. His books were all written with the help of Denis Gingras, Ph.D., an oncology researcher at the Centre de cancérologie Charles-Bruneau located at the Centre hospitalier universitaire Sainte-Justine in Montreal. Béliveau also published many scientific articles.
