= Bopha! =

1993 American film by Morgan Freeman

- Theatrical release poster
- Directed by: Morgan Freeman
- Screenplay by: Brian Bird; John Wierick
- Based on: Bopha! by Percy Mtwa
- Produced by: Lawrence N. Taubman
- Starring: Danny Glover; Malcolm McDowell; Alfre Woodard; Marius Weyers
- Cinematography: David Watkin
- Edited by: Neil Travis
- Music by: James Horner
- Production company: Arsenio Hall Communications
- Distributed by: Paramount Pictures
- Release dates: September 17, 1993 (TIFF); September 24, 1993 (United States)
- Running time: 118 minutes
- Country: United States
- Language: English
- Budget: $12 million
- Box office: $212,483

Bopha! is a 1993 American drama film directed by Morgan Freeman and starring Danny Glover. It is Freeman's directorial debut. It was adapted from a 1986 play of the same name.

== Story ==
Micah Mangena is a black police officer in South Africa during the apartheid era. Micah is tough but honest, and he believes he is doing the best for his people. He is a sergeant, with a white superior officer and in a mostly-black force. He trains new recruits, all of them black.

His son, Zweli Mangena is in a difficult position – Micah wants him to become a policeman and follow his example. Zweli loves his father, but has doubts about whether it is right to follow in his father's footsteps.

Wider events are barely seen, though they obviously have an influence. In 1986, when the play was written, Nelson Mandela was still in prison. By 1993, when the film was released, he was free but the future was still very uncertain.

== Plot ==
The film opens with a black crowd burning alive a black police officer, from a nearby ghetto that they regard as a traitor. It then switches to the peaceful home of Micah "Baba" Mangena, a black sergeant in the South African Police.

His son Zweli Mangena increasingly questions Micah's belief and Micah's wish that Zweli would follow him into the police. Micha's wife also has doubts as the once-peaceful township gets polarised and her neighbours start treating her as an enemy.

The initial issue is the introduction of Afrikaans in the all-black school. The school children speak English and their own Bantu languages, but they resent being coerced to learn Afrikaans. To reply in English or their first languages is an act of rebellion.

Zweli dislikes the system but fears the consequence of open opposition. He arranges a meeting between some of the hot-heads and Pule Rampa, a respected figure who has been in prison for anti-Apartheid activities. He seems to be trying to calm the situation, but the police have learned of the gathering and break it up, arresting some of the students and also Pule Rampa. He had been trying to slip away quietly, but Micah anticipates this and arrests him. Micah is in charge of the operation and has attempted moderation, letting some of the students go free.

Micah wants to conduct his own questioning. But two members of South Africa's Special Branch have recently arrived and take over. They employ much more brutal methods. Both Micah and his white superior suggest to the Special Branch men that they are perhaps provoking opposition rather than quelling it, by torturing and hanging Pule in his cell.

The situation does indeed escalate. Micah and Zweli are increasingly on opposite sides of a widening gap, even though each of them genuinely cares for the other.

== Reception ==
The film holds a score of 82% on review aggregator Rotten Tomatoes, based on 11 reviews, with an average rating of 7.0/10. It was a box office bomb, grossing only $212,483 against the production budget of $12 million.

== DVD release ==
The film was released as a DVD in 2005 and has a running-time of 114 minutes, 4 minutes shorter than the theatrical version. But when it was reissued on DVD in 2021, it has the original 118 minute theatrical version.
