= 9:30 Club =

Nightclub and concert venue in Washington, D.C.

Coordinates: 38°55′05″N 77°01′26″W

- The 9:30

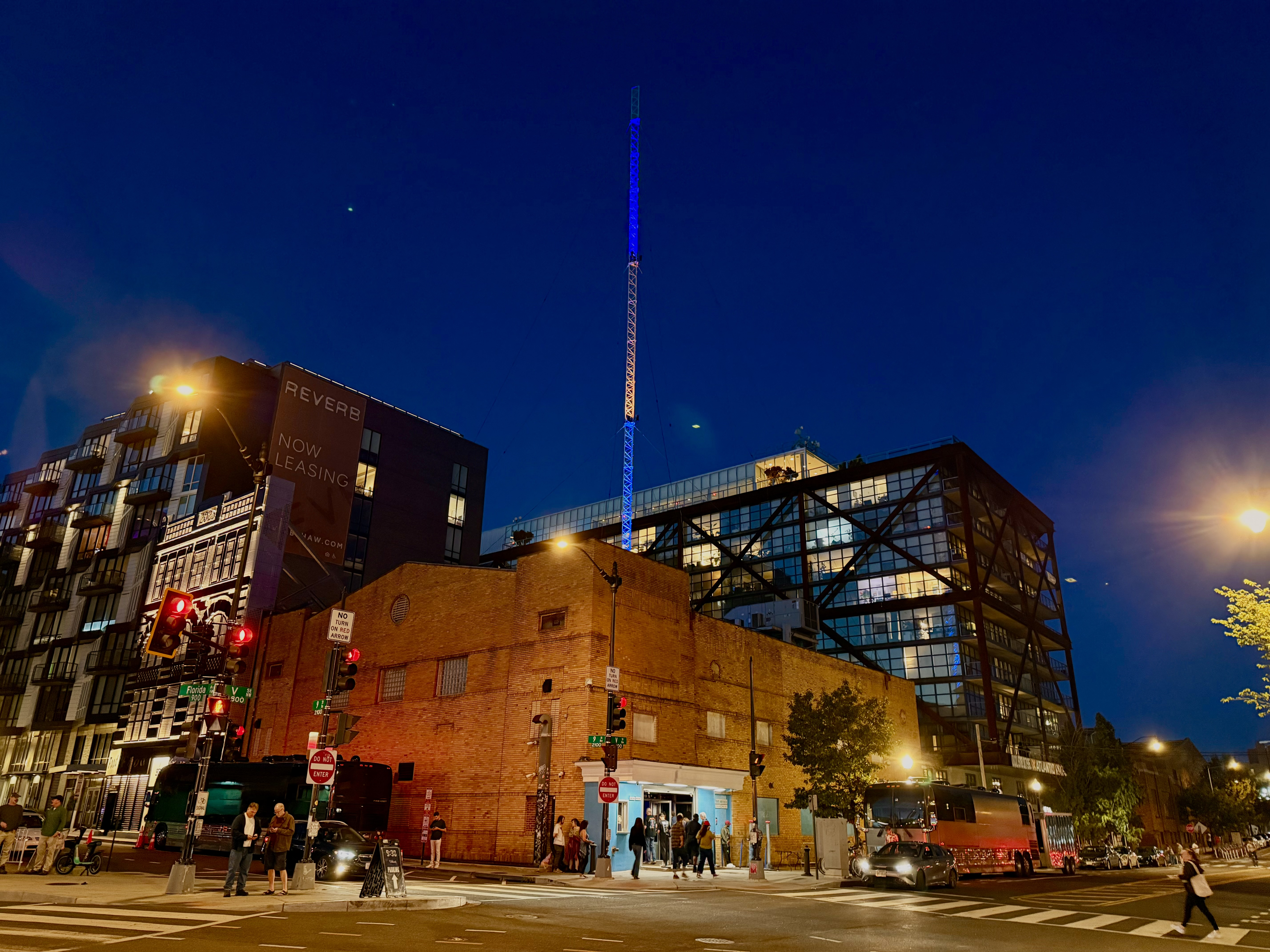
- 9:30 Club on a summer night
- Interactive map of 9:30 Club
- Former names: Atlantis (1977–1979); Nightclub 9:30 (1980–1995)
- Address: 815 V St NW; Washington, D.C. 20001-3020
- Location: U Street Corridor
- Owner: Jon Bowers and Dody DiSanto (1980–1986); Richard Heinecke and Seth Hurwitz (since 1986)
- Seating type: Standing room / bar and balcony seating
- Capacity: 1,200
- Public transit: Washington Metro at U Street

Construction
- Opened: May 31, 1980

Website
- Venue Website

The 9:30 Club, originally named Nightclub 9:30 and also known simply as the 9:30, is a nightclub and concert venue in Washington, D.C. In 2018, Rolling Stone named the 9:30 Club one of the 10 best live music venues in the United States.

The club opened on May 31, 1980, on the ground floor rear room of the Atlantic Building at 930 F Street NW, in Downtown Washington, D.C. with a legal standing capacity of 199. In 1996, the club moved to a larger location at its current location at 815 V Street NW, where it anchors the eastern end of the U Street Corridor.

The 9:30 Club's name was derived from its original street address, which was also the reason to set the venue's original opening time of 9:30 p.m. Early advertising on WHFS radio featured the club's slogan, "9:30 – a Place and Time!"

== History ==
=== Nightclub 9:30 ===
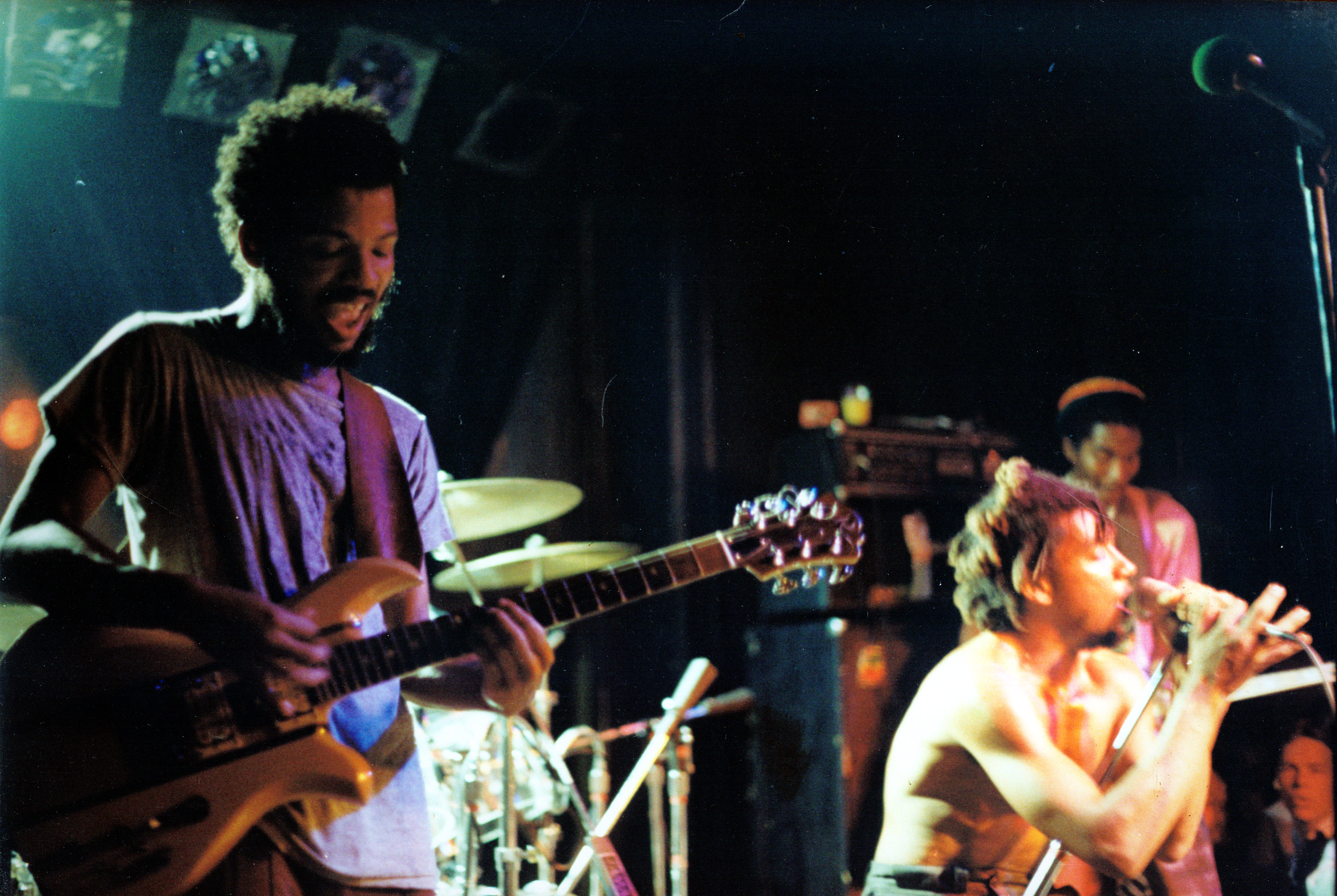
Bad Brains performing at Nightclub 9:30 in 1983

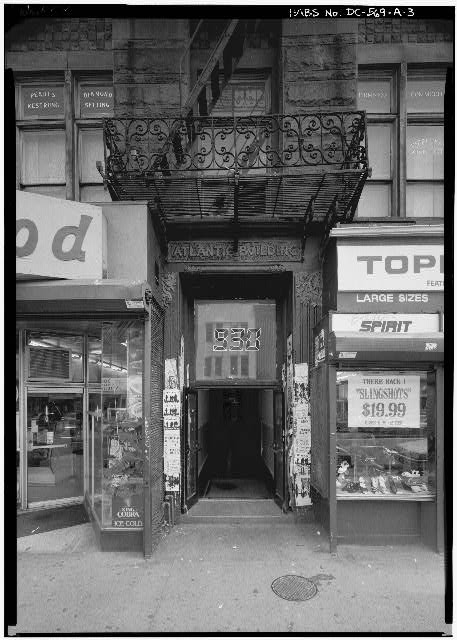
The entrance to the original Nightclub 9:30 in the Atlantic Building in 1990

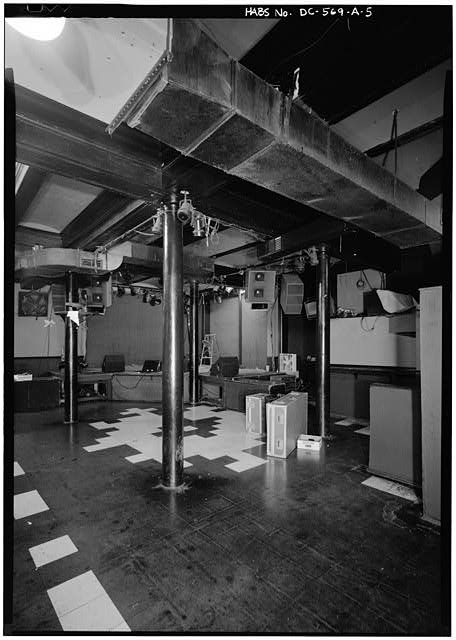
The interior of the original Nightclub 9:30 in 1990 with the stage visible in the background

Nightclub 9:30 was founded by artist and dancer Dody DiSanto and her husband, Jon Bowers, a local real estate developer and music enthusiast who purchased the Atlantic Building, located at 930 F Street NW, just around the corner from Ford's Theater, in 1979. The Atlantic Building was full of artists even before it became the 9:30 Club.

On May 31, 1980, the venue hosted its first show, featuring New York City-based jazz-punk band the Lounge Lizards and local new wave band Tiny Desk Unit as the opening act. The Fleshtones were the first band ever to be booked at the club.

Since its founding, Nightclub 9:30, which allowed fans as young as 16-years-old to enter, was known as a progressive venue noted for its talent in discovering up-and-coming acts. During the early 1980s, it was the home for alternative music in Washington, D.C., just as the genre was beginning to blossom. On May 21, 1981, Washington, D.C. music programmer and writer Tom Terrell was instrumental in masterminding the U.S. premiere of reggae band Steel Pulse on the night of Bob Marley's funeral, which was broadcast live worldwide from Nightclub 9:30.

Over the 1980s, the club largely featured local bands, including from the punk, hardcore, and go-go genres. James Blood Ulmer played in 1982.

In 1986, after six years of operating the club, Bowers and DiSanto sold it to Seth Hurwitz and Richard Heinecke of It's My Party (I.M.P.), the Maryland-based concert promotion company they co-own.

The venue also became a regular stopping point for punk and new wave bands touring the East Coast.

Over the following years, as the club's prominence and lineup were growing, the need for a bigger space was becoming increasingly evident. In preparation for the move, the owners purchased and extensively renovated the former WUST Radio Music Hall at 815 V Street.

The old Nightclub 9:30 closed its doors on December 31, 1995. The club's final shows at the original location were memorialized on a two-CD set released in 1997 and entitled 9:30 Live – A Time, A Place, A Scene. This live CD, recorded between December 28, 1995, and January 1, 1996, includes local music from the Urban Verbs, Tiny Desk Unit, Mother May I, the Insect Surfers, Tru Fax and the Insaniacs, and Black Market Baby.

In 2023, Hurwitz opened The Atlantis, a small club designed to evoke the original Nightclub 9:30. In the opening ceremony, the Mayor of D.C. designated May 30th as "9:30 Club Day".

=== 9:30 Club ===
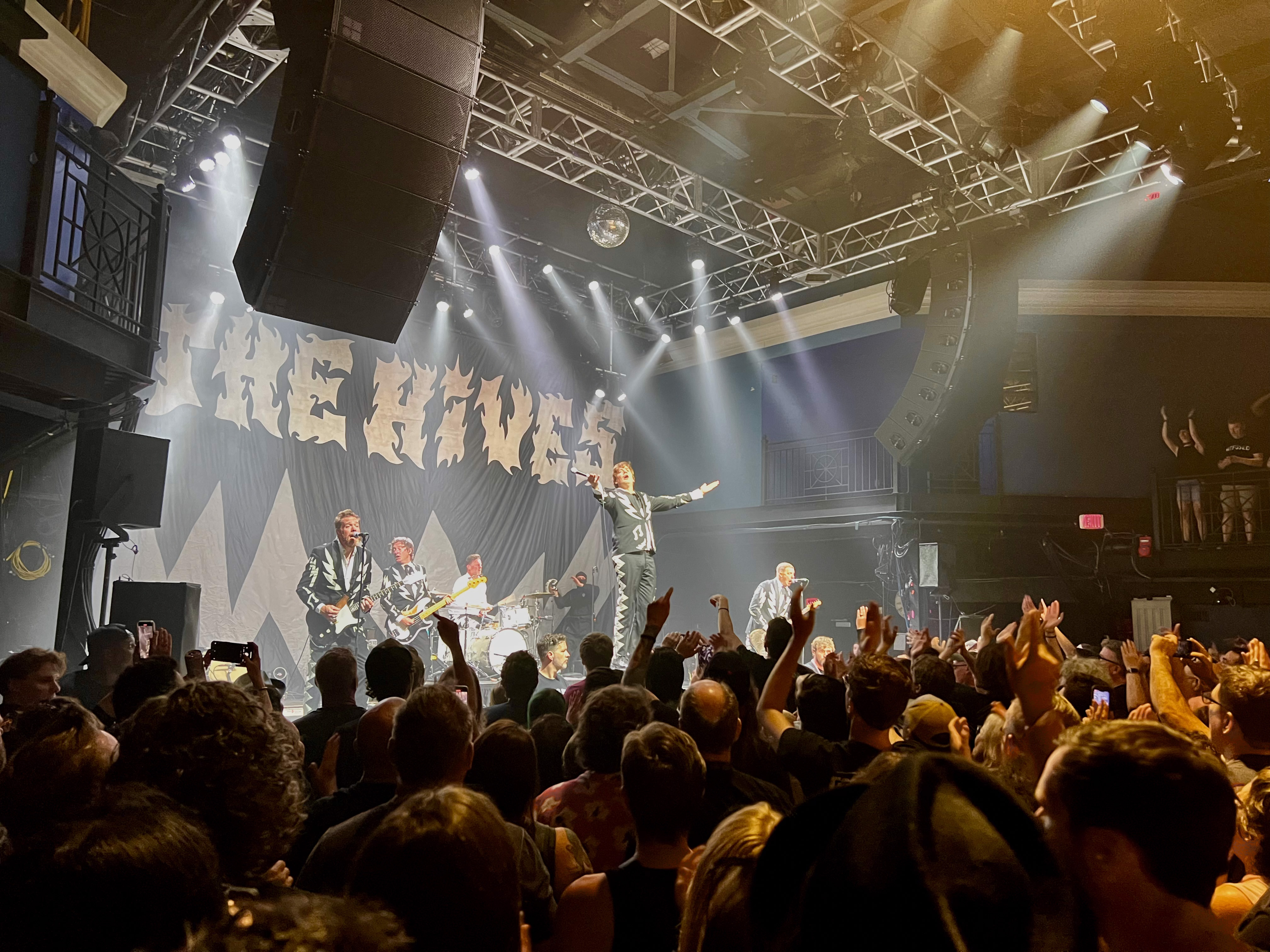
The Hives – Live at the 930 Club, July 2024

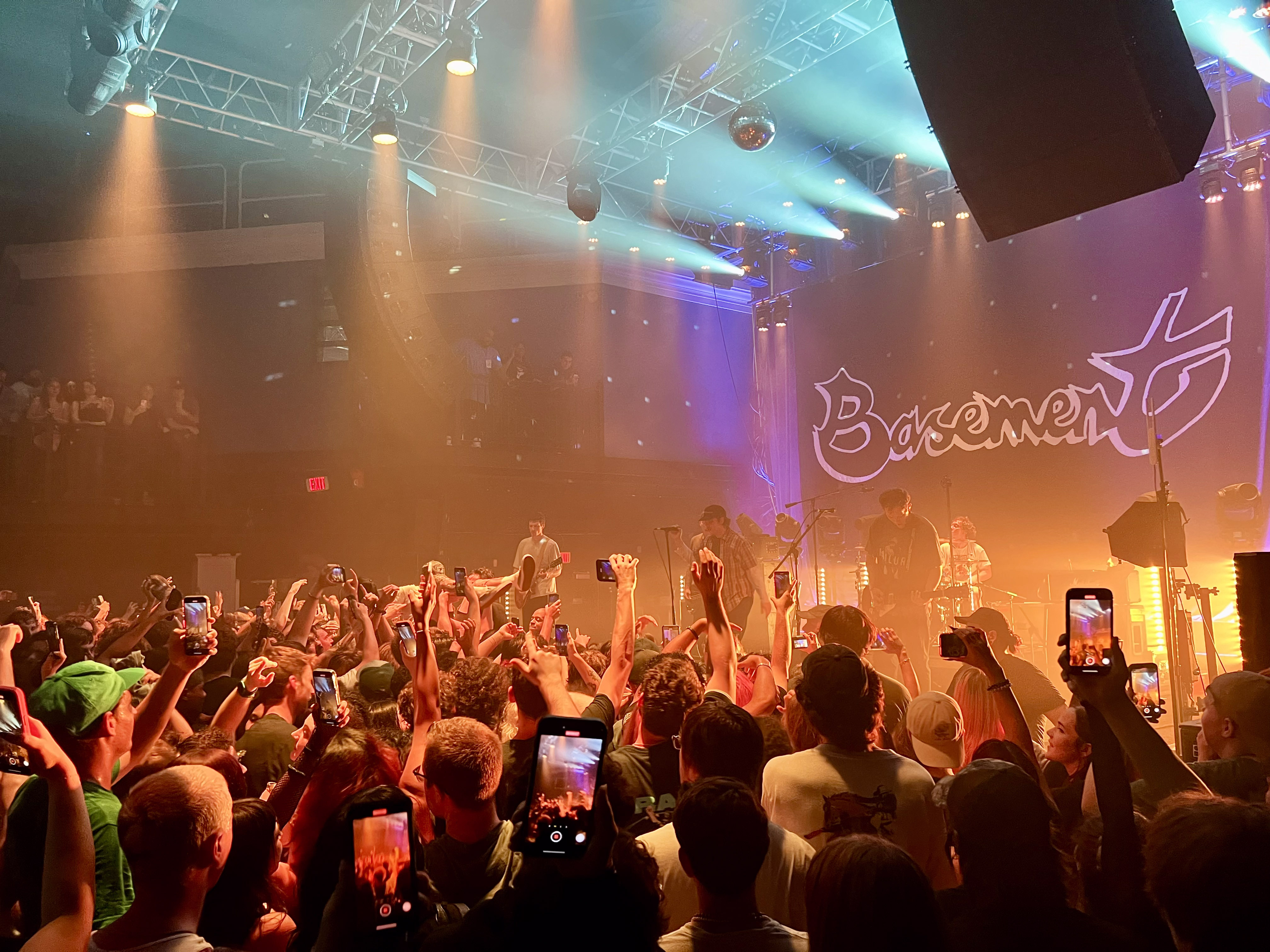
Basement – Live at the 9:30 Club, September 2024

Prior to its reopening, the club owners organized a "christening" show for media and friends featuring the Fleshtones and Too Much Joy. On January 5, 1996, the new 9:30 Club opened to the public with a show that included the Smashing Pumpkins.

The club has a distinctive wheeled stage mounted on rails, which can be moved back and forth as needed. This way, the place can feel as packed with 500 people in attendance as it would during a sold-out 1,200-person show.

In the early 21st century, Government Issue, Iron Cross, the Slickee Boys, Urban Verbs, Chuck Brown ("The Godfather of Go-Go") played in 2005. In 1999, Foo Fighters played there.

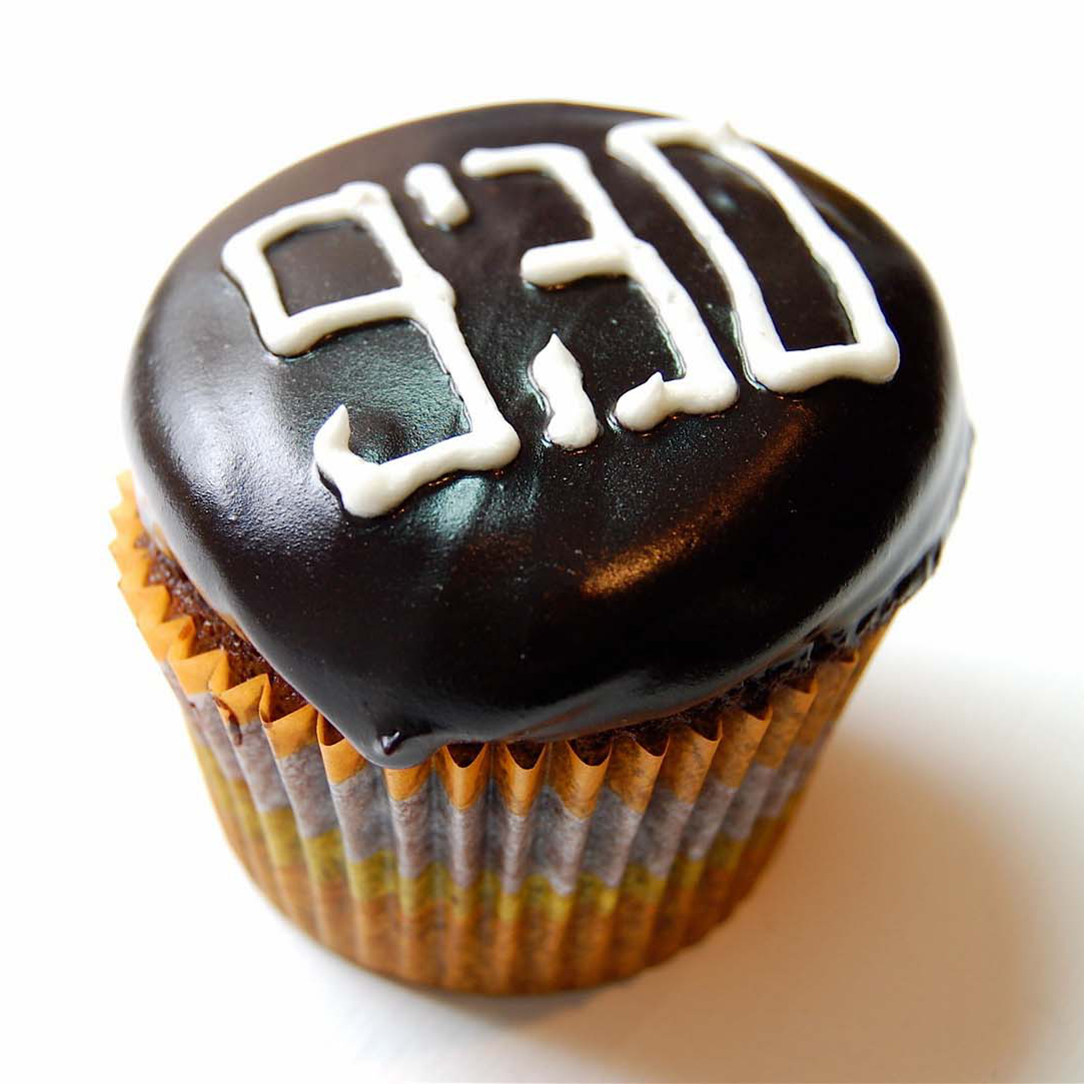
9:30 Cupcake

During the band Cake's two-night run on May 30 and 31, 2009, the 9:30 Club introduced the official 9:30 Cupcake, made by Buzz Bakeshop of Alexandria, Virginia. The 9:30 Cupcake is a devil's food cupcake with chocolate frosting and the club's italicized "9:30" logo on the top in white icing. The club is known for giving cupcakes to all performers at the venue.

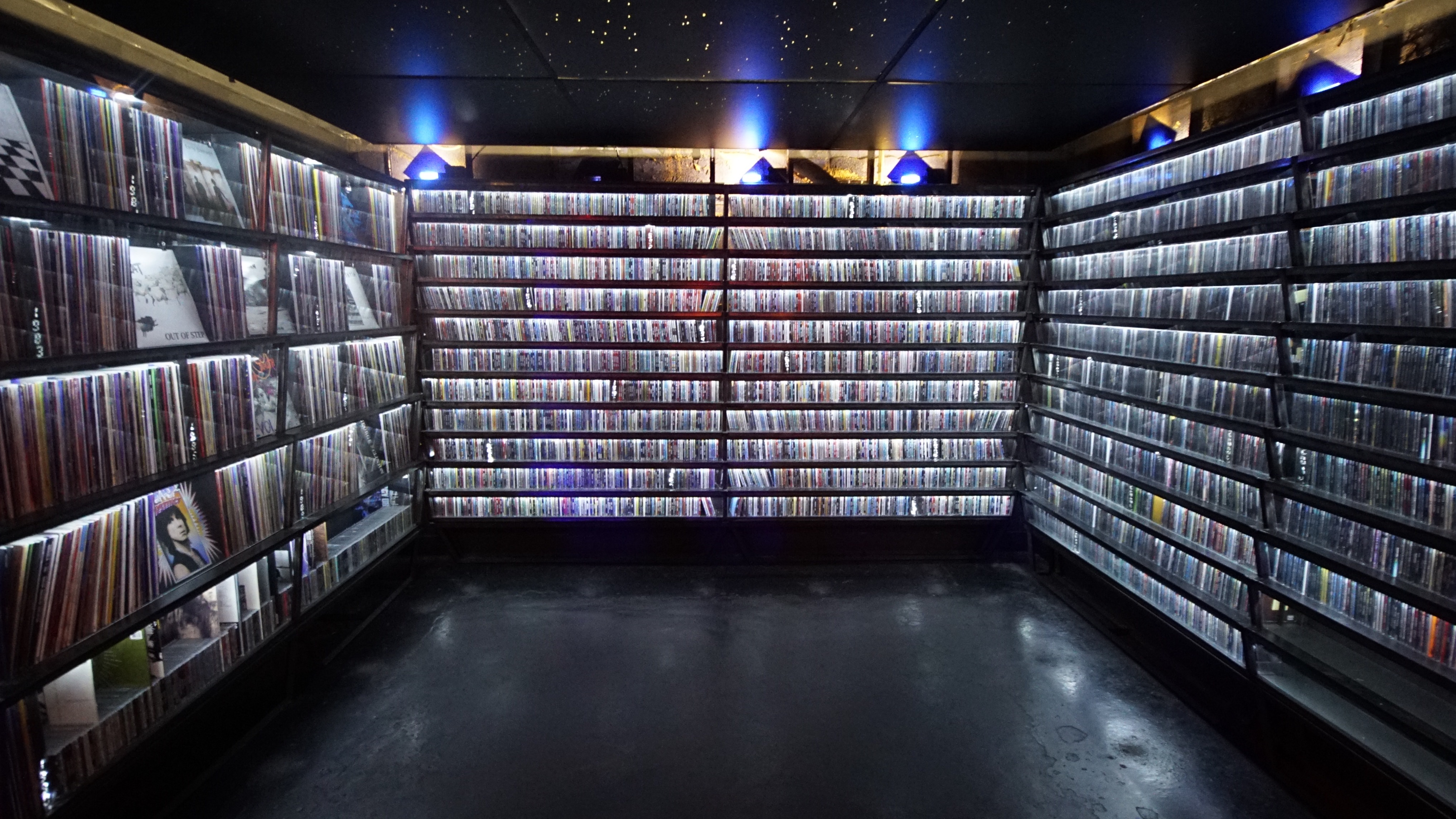
The Hall of Records

In January 2016, 9:30 celebrated its 35th birthday by opening its doors for an interactive exhibition detailing the club's vast history, the "9:30 World's Fair". This exhibition highlighted the pieces of the old 930 F St. location that made the trip to 815 V St., while taking fans through the dressing rooms and items like the hair dryer purchased specifically for James Brown.

In February 2016, it was announced that the 9:30 Club would produce a new musically-centered variety show for PBS, featuring five acts per episode alongside a variety of comedy and short films. Live at 9:30 debuted in May, with a mix of contributors and hosts including Henry Rollins, NPR Music's Bob Boilen, Hannibal Buress, Jill Kargman, Ralphie May and Tony Rock

== Notable shows ==
=== 20th century ===
- In July 1999, Emmet Swimming played one of the first shows at the new 9:30 on a snowy night and recorded part of their live concert CD Earplugs 50¢ at the venue.
- On December 3 and December 5, 1997, Bob Dylan played shows while he was in Washington, D.C., to receive the Kennedy Center Honors. Dylan returned for an unannounced show on April 2, 2004, before scheduled dates at the Bender Arena and the Warner Theatre.
- On June 12, 1998, Red Hot Chili Peppers performed a surprise eleven-song set at the club. The show, which was the band's first at the new venue (they had previously performed at the old 9:30 Club five times from 1985 to 1987), was their first public performance since reuniting with guitarist John Frusciante, who had quit the band in 1992. The 9:30 Club show was seen as a warm-up for their performance the next day at the Tibetan Freedom Concert, which was held at the RFK Stadium in Washington, D.C.; when bad weather cancelled their set at the concert, Pearl Jam shortened their own set so the Chili Peppers could perform a few songs.

=== 21st century ===
- On November 23 and 24, 2001, O.A.R., whose members grew up in nearby Rockville, Maryland, recorded the live album Any Time Now at the 9:30 Club.
- On June 2 and 3, 2002, Jimmy Eat World, an Arizona band, recorded their live DVD Believe in What You Want at the nightclub, following the release of their album Bleed American. The video was released on November 26, 2002.
- In 2003, local band the Pietasters released their first live video DVD, Live at The 9:30 Club.
- On October 7, 2005, Bob Mould performed at the club, and released a subsequent DVD of the concert called Circle of Friends.
- On November 24, 2007, Hawthorne Heights guitarist and screamer Casey Calvert was found dead of a drug overdose on their tour bus, which was parked outside the club.
- On December 28, 2009, Clutch recorded their DVD Live at the 9:30, performing their self-titled album, Clutch, in its entirety.
- On May 31, 2010, the 9:30 Club celebrated its 30th anniversary with a lineup stretching its history, including Tiny Desk Unit, the Fleshtones, Tommy Keene, the Slickee Boys, the Psychedelic Furs, Marti Jones and Don Dixon, Clutch, Trouble Funk, the Evens, Justin Jones, the Pietasters, Pete Stahl, Ted Leo, Bob Mould, and Dave Grohl. The event was hosted by Henry Rollins.
- In June 2010, Courtney Love and the newly reformed Hole performed a disastrous set described by The Washington Post as a three-hour epic train wreck. A barely coherent Love stumbled, complained and stripped through an entire set composed mostly of incomplete versions of the band's songs. Most members of the audience left before the set ended.
- On July 30, 2010, house music producer deadmau5 collapsed on stage in the middle of a set and was rushed to the hospital. He had been suffering from exhaustion and vomiting. This collapse led to the cancellation of the nine shows which followed the event.
- On February 24, 2012, the Soul Rebels Brass Band were the subject of an NPR national broadcast of their show with Galactic live from the 9:30 Club. The broadcast was syndicated on NPR and through other affiliates across the United States, as well as webcast on NPR.org.
- On June 12, 2013, Animal Collective performed a set of songs previously released on their LPs and EPs. The show was documented on the album Live at 9:30.
- In 2013, hardcore punk supergroup, Off!, released the limited edition vinyl album, Live at 9:30 Club, which featured their performance from June 25, 2011.
- On January 27, 2016, Jack's Mannequin returned to the road to honor the 10-year anniversary of the album Everything in Transit. Playing just weeks after the death of David Bowie, Andrew McMahon also performed an acoustic rendition of "Life on Mars".
- On August 24, 2016, ZZ Top performed for a sold-out audience, the "Surprise! At the Club!" performance having only been announced two weeks prior. Jonny "2 Bags" Wickersham of Social Distortion opened the show, which saw ZZ performing all of their classic hits before concluding with a cover of Elvis Presley's "Jailhouse Rock".
- December 14, 2016, Jimmy Eat World returned to 9:30 Club for another "Surprise! At the Club!"
- In January 2017, 9:30 Club partnered with Planned Parenthood for two shows. The first, a free event titled "Show Up!", took place on January 19, 2017 featuring Common and The National. The second was the official 2017 Women's March after-party/benefit show hosted by Funny or Die on January 21, 2017, titled "Laugh, Dance... then Get to Work!" Special guests at this performance included Senators Al Franken and Cory Booker, Sleater-Kinney, Sara Bareilles, Sam Harris of X Ambassadors, Ted Leo, Dirty Projectors' David Longstreth, the National, Ani DiFranco, Samantha Ronson, Macklemore, Tig Notaro, Janeane Garofalo, Lizzy Caplan, Ashley Judd, Rosario Dawson, Eric Andre, Michelle Rodriguez, Cameron Esposito and River Butcher, Ronna and Beverly, Casey Wilson, June Diane Raphael, and Morgan Walsh.
- On August 19, 2017, 9:30 opened its doors to celebrate the life and art of prolific graffiti icon Cool "Disco" Dan, with performances from DJ Flexx, the Howard University Choir, and legendary go-go band Rare Essence, as well as an appearance by Mayor Muriel Bowser proclaiming August 19 "Cool 'Disco' Dan Day".

== Legacy ==
The 9:30 Club has been awarded "Nightclub of the Year" by Pollstar 13 times, the most of any club in Pollstar history, including five years in a row from 2012 to 2016.

For much of that time, it has regularly topped that concert industry trade journal's annual list of the top ticket-selling clubs in the United States. In 2014, the 9:30 Club sold 284,309 tickets, the second most for a nightclub worldwide.

The venue won the Top Club award in 2007 and again from 2009 through 2012 at the Billboard Touring Awards.

Touring artists and managers in conjunction with Rolling Stone rated the club the No. 1 Big Room in America.
