= Honky Tonk Confidential =

Background information
- Genres: Honky tonk, country
- Years active: 1996
- Members: Sam Goodall; Mark Lindamood; Bobby Martin; Diana Quinn; Bob Schieffer; Mike Woods
- Past members: Geff King; Dave Elliott
- Website: www.honkytonkconfidential.com

Honky Tonk Confidential is a retro/alt country band from the Washington, D.C. area. The band's latest CD is the result of a collaboration with CBS News chief Washington correspondent and Face the Nation anchor, Bob Schieffer. Schieffer penned the lyrics to four of the tunes on Road Kill Stew and Other News (with Special Guest Bob Schieffer), and he sings on his own "TV Anchorman." One of HTC's members, guitarist and vocalist Diana Quinn, was a founding member of Tru Fax & the Insaniacs, an early DC punk/new wave band.

== History ==
HTC formed in 1996, and played its first gig at the JV's Restaurant, a Falls Church honky tonk. Since then, the band has played in most major venues in the DC area and recorded four CDs, as well as numerous compilation cuts. HTC has won many Washington Area Musicians Association (WAMA) awards, including Debut Album and Country Album for its eponymous 1999 CD (Honky Tonk Confidential). The band's second CD, Your Trailer or Mine? (2002), won Album of the Year and Country Album, and its third CD, Who Gets the Fruitcake This Year? (2006), received Wammy awards for Country Album and Song of the Year. Possibly the only song about Pee Wee Herman, "Pee Wee's Gone", is on Your Trailer or Mine?, and the first country song (and likely the last) about Hanukkah is "Honky Tonk Hannukah", which can be found on Who Gets the Fruitcake This Year?. Road Kill Stew and other News contains the parody of Johnny Cash's "A Boy Named Sue", called "A Girl Named Dick".

HTC contributed many songs to the various baseball and Christmas CDs released by the non-profit Hungry for Music, including "Nolan Ryan's Fastball", which was performed widely in 2006 as part of the Baseball Music Project, an orchestral program comprising baseball songs. The band's song "That's Nats" is played during baseball season at Washington Nationals games. Along with the HTC CDs, Diana Quinn also produced a compilation alt country CD called Greetings from the District of Country, which includes cuts by Louise Kirchen (married to Bill Kirchen), Tex Rubinowitz, and Kevin Johnson and the Linemen.

Original founding members Diana Quinn (guitar, vocals) and Mike Woods (lead guitar, vocals) perform with Sam Goodall (bass), Mark Lindamood (drums), and Bobby Martin (pedal steel guitar).

The band claims classic honky tonk and western swing as major influences, including country music giants Johnny Cash and Bob Wills. Quinn comes from a punk/classical background; She was a founding member of one of Washington DC's early punk/new wave bands, Tru Fax & the Insaniacs and she studied for more than a decade with the classical guitar pioneer Sophocles Papas. Mike Woods is considered one of the area's top guitar wranglers, and plays a Fender Telecaster. Diana and Sam also play Fender guitars. Mark joined the band in 2006 and plays Ludwig drums. Bass player Geff King, a prolific songwriter who wrote many of the songs on the group's earlier CDs, left the band in 2006.

In 2006, the band began working with Bob Schieffer, recording the album Road Kill Stew and Other News.

== Discography ==
=== Albums ===
- 2007 - Road Kill Stew and Other News (with Special Guest Bob Schieffer)
- 2006 – Who Gets the Fruitcake This Year?
- 2002 – Your Trailer or Mine?
- 1999 – Honky Tonk Confidential

=== Individual cuts ===
- 2000 – Greetings from The District of Country (produced by Diana Quinn): Includes "Barroom Tan", "I Done It (and I'm Glad)", and Wanda Jackson's "Fujiyama Mama"
- 2005 – Diamond Cuts (Vol. VIII) (Hungry for Music): "American Pastime in Black and White" and "That's Nats"
- 2005 – A Chanukah Feast (HFM): "Honky Tonk Hannukah"
- 2005 – A Holiday Feast (Vol. VIII)(HFM): "Santa is a Working Man"
- 2003 – Crème de La Crème (HFM): "Who Gets the Fruitcake This Year?"
- 2002 – A Holiday Feast (Vol. VII) (HFM): Buck Owens' "Blue Christmas Lights"
- 2001 – A Holiday Feast (Vol. VI) (HFM): A cow-surf version of "O Come O Come Emmanuel"
- 2001 – Night of 100 Elvises (HFM): "(Now and Then There's) A Fool Such as I"
- 2001 – Nolan Ryan A Musical Tribute (HFM): Jerry Jeff Walker's "Nolan Ryan" and "Nolan Ryan's Fastball"
- 2001 – Diamond Cuts Triple Play (HFM): "Nolan Ryan's Fastball"
- 2000 – A Holiday Feast (Vol. V)(HFM): "Who Gets the Fruitcake This Year?"
- 1999 – A Holiday Feast (Vol. IV)(HFM): "Santa's Got That Ol' TB"
- 1998 – A Holiday Feast (Vol. III)(HFM): "Drivin' into Bethlehem"
- 1998 – Edges from the Postcard II (P2 Records/Twangfest): "Honky Tonk 101"

== See also ==
- Tru Fax and the Insaniacs
