= Live at 9:30 =

- Logo
- Country of origin: United States

Production
- Production locations: Washington, D.C.
- Production company: The Content Farm

Original release
- Release: 2016 – present

Live At 9:30 is a music variety show filmed at the 9:30 Club in Washington, D.C. Each one-hour episode features a collection of acts from different genres, interspersed with interviews, short films, and comedic segments.

== Series summary ==
The premiere season of Live at 9:30 features performances by Garbage, The Arcs, Tove Lo, Ibeyi, El Vy, MisterWives, The Jesus and Mary Chain, Frank Turner, MS MR, Cold War Kids, Youth Lagoon, and Jess Glynne. The twelve episode season also features a mix of contributors and hosts, including Henry Rollins, NPR Music's Bob Boilen, Hannibal Buress, Jill Kargman, Ralphie May and Tony Rock.

Wayne White, of "Pee-wee's Playhouse" fame is the show's art director.

== Production ==
Production of the series began in the fall of 2015.

== Venue ==
The 9:30 Club opened in 1980 and was named after the club's original address, 930 F St. NW in downtown Washington, D.C. It later moved to its current location at 815 V Street NW, anchoring the eastern end of the U Street Corridor. Co-owned by Rich Heinecke and Seth Hurwitz, the club has a capacity of 1200 people. It won the Top Club awards at the 2007 through 2012 Billboard Touring Awards.

== Release ==
Live at 9:30 is scheduled to air in the spring of 2016 on PBS. Full episodes and digital exclusive content will be available on the official Live At 9:30 website following each episode's TV debut.
