= Madam Secretary season 1 =

Season of television series

Madam Secretary
- Season 1
- DVD cover
- No. of episodes: 22

Release
- Original network: CBS
- Original release: September 21, 2014 – May 3, 2015

Season chronology
- Next → Season 2

The first season of Madam Secretary, an American political drama television series, originally aired in the United States on CBS from September 21, 2014, through May 3, 2015. The season was produced by CBS Television Studios, with Barbara Hall as showrunner and executive producer. The pilot was ordered in January 2014, and CBS picked up the series in May 2014. In October 2014, CBS ordered nine more episodes of Madam Secretary, bringing the total episode order to a full season of 22 episodes. In January 2015, CBS renewed the series for a second season.

The series follows Elizabeth Adams McCord (Téa Leoni), a former CIA analyst who is appointed to the position of United States Secretary of State by incumbent Republican President of the United States Conrad Dalton (Keith Carradine). In accepting the position, McCord must negotiate not only with foreign dignitaries, but also with her husband Henry (Tim Daly), and a staff inherited from her deceased predecessor, including his mistress Nadine Tolliver (Bebe Neuwirth).

== Cast and characters ==
=== Main ===
- Téa Leoni as Elizabeth McCord, the U.S. Secretary of State
- Tim Daly as Henry McCord, Elizabeth's husband, a religious scholar, and an NSA operative
- Erich Bergen as Blake Moran, Elizabeth's personal assistant
- Patina Miller as Daisy Grant, Elizabeth's press coordinator
- Geoffrey Arend as Matt Mahoney, Elizabeth's speechwriter
- Katherine Herzer as Alison McCord, Elizabeth and Henry's younger daughter
- Evan Roe as Jason McCord, Elizabeth and Henry's son
- Wallis Currie-Wood as Stevie McCord, Elizabeth and Henry's older daughter
- Željko Ivanek as Russell Jackson, White House Chief of Staff
- Bebe Neuwirth as Nadine Tolliver, Elizabeth's Chief of Staff

=== Recurring ===
- Keith Carradine as Conrad Dalton, the President of the United States
- Sebastian Arcelus as Jay Whitman, Elizabeth's policy advisor
- Patrick Breen as Andrew Munsey, the Director of the Central Intelligence Agency
- Marin Hinkle as Isabelle, a CIA analyst, friend and former colleague of Elizabeth
- Nilaja Sun as Juliet Humphrey, a CIA analyst, other friend and former colleague of Elizabeth
- Francis Jue as Chen, the Foreign Minister of China

=== Guests ===
- Louis Gossett Jr. as Laurent Vasseur, a Catholic priest and an old friend of Henry's
- Shivam Chopra as Sanjay
- Sam Daly as Win Barrington
- William Allen Young as Steven Cushing, the U.S. Deputy Secretary of State.
- Tom Skerritt as Patrick McCord, Henry's father
- Bob Schieffer as himself, a former moderator of Face the Nation
- Marsha Mason as Kinsey Sherman

== Episodes ==
No. overall	No. in season	Title	Directed by	Written by	Original release date	U.S. viewers (millions)
1	1	"Pilot"	David Semel	Barbara Hall	September 21, 2014	14.75
Elizabeth McCord, a former CIA analyst, gets recruited and trained by the current POTUS. Due to the death of the current Secretary of State in a plane crash, the President asks her to become the new Secretary of State, because she can think outside the box. Two months later, McCord is faced by an issue of two American children held hostage in Syria. The POTUS's Chief of Staff plays a game to damage her reputation and then advises the President to not do anything about the kidnapping. But McCord convinces the President to get the boys out through back-channel sources. Meanwhile, one of her former CIA colleagues warns her that her predecessor may have been killed by the CIA. He is later found dead in a car crash, which McCord believes was not an accident.
2	2	"Another Benghazi"	David Semel	Barbara Hall	September 28, 2014	12.72
When crowds surround the U.S. Embassy in Yemen, the Secretary, using her CIA analyst skills, believes it will be another Benghazi incident. She asks her ambassador to leave, but he refuses citing the political need of his presence. Her requests for additional security troops are rejected, and ultimately she uses her discretionary funds to avail of a private military security detail, of whom she was critical earlier. Ultimately, her fears are realized when the embassy is bombed. However, the PMC security detail was successfully able to get the ambassador out, losing one of their own in the process.
3	3	"The Operative"	Jeremy Webb	David Grae	October 5, 2014	12.18
Internal State Department cables are released to the press by a hacker known as Viper. Elizabeth learns that Viper also has information on their undercover agents, and convinces the president that they should all be brought in. One agent is taken in Pakistan before reaching the embassy. Elizabeth suggests using Russia to offer Pakistan a ballistics system in exchange for the agent, and convinces Henry to give the Russian minister's daughter an "incomplete" rather than a "C" so that Russia will go along with the deal.
4	4	"Just Another Normal Day"	Eric Stoltz	Joan Rater & Tony Phelan	October 12, 2014	11.45
Elizabeth arranges an agreement between Japan and China regarding uninhabited islands with natural gas deposits, but China refuses to sign the treaty when a Chinese student visiting the US asks for political asylum. Elizabeth talks with the student and learns that it was really the student's mother who wanted this. Because the student says she wants to return to China, Elizabeth tells the Chinese ambassador that she will return the student after the treaty is signed. Elizabeth attends a memorial for her friend George and another for Marsh. Nadine reveals to Elizabeth that she and Marsh had been having an affair.
5	5	"Blame Canada"	Eriq La Salle	Paul Redford	October 19, 2014	12.28
The Canadian ambassador asks the Secretary to read, approve and release an environmental report that will allow a joint Canada-U.S. pipeline to be built. She reads the report and finds out that it has been prepared by a lobby group that supports the pipeline and contains falsified data. The Canadian ambassador tries to pressure her to approve the report but she counters with her own pressure tactics. The ongoing talks with Iran over dismantling their nuclear processing plants are deadlocked. Despite the Secretary's instructions, with the President's approval, to offer some trade ban relaxations in exchange, the Chief Negotiator only threatens military action during the talks which causes Iran to back-out completely. So she goes behind his back to talk to a member of Iran's negotiation team and makes the offer which Iran accepts, resolving the crisis. And then she fires the Chief Negotiator for lying to the President and herself. She later asks Blake to conduct a confidential investigation on Nadine, her Chief of Staff.
6	6	"The Call"	Mark Piznarski	Matt Ward	October 26, 2014	11.71
When a former teacher of Henry McCord reaches out and warns of a possible genocide in his home country, Elizabeth asks the President to intervene. Though he initially refuses, hearing her speech that the world should have guts to intervene in this, he relents and authorizes logistical and air support. But when it is revealed that the former teacher's charity was allowing refugees to carry drugs for the warlords, complications arise in the coalition. Meanwhile, Nadine is cleared in the investigation, and she is informed by Elizabeth.
7	7	"Passage"	Martha Coolidge	Alex Cooley	November 2, 2014	13.21
The President 'suggests' that Elizabeth's first foreign trip should be to India, to help one of his biggest supporters. She brings her younger children with her. A massive earthquake hits that causes an explosion at an American-owned factory, and she is separated from Alison during the chaos. Meanwhile, Stevie sees her father with a young woman and suspects that he is having an affair, causing her to get drunk. But it turns out that he has been reactivated by the NSA and the young woman is actually Henry's handler.
8	8	"Need to Know"	Dennie Gordon	Alexander Maggio	November 9, 2014	12.54
A friend of Elizabeth's from the CIA accompanies the Prime Minister of Moldova at her request to help prepare a strategy to fight a warlord who is trying to foment a coup. Their plane is taken hostage by the rebels. She supports a military action to get the American back, which succeeds. Henry is working for the NSA again, trying to plant a bug in the house of an old friend who is suspected of smuggling chemical weapons. Elizabeth tells her old CIA colleagues Isabelle and Juliet of her suspicions about Marsh and George's deaths.
9	9	"So It Goes"	James Whitmore Jr.	David Grae	November 16, 2014	12.77
The last day and death of Marsh are revealed in flashbacks. Elizabeth identifies the airplane fueler who sabotaged Marsh's plane. Matt confesses to Elizabeth that Russell is pressuring him to spy on her. Glenn woos Nadine.
10	10	"Collateral Damage"	Eric Stoltz	Matt Ward	November 23, 2014	12.41
Threat from a deranged gunman causes a lock-down at the State Department. Elizabeth talks to Stevie about her CIA past, when an Iraqi translator threatens to do so to her and others. Revealing stories of being present when tortures were carried out during questioning, Elizabeth is unable to make Stevie understand the compulsions of that time causing a rift between mother and daughter. Elizabeth manages to keep Arab leaders gathered in the building from launching verbal attacks on one another. Matt tells Daisy's fiance about their affair.
11	11	"Game On"	Randy Zisk	Paul Redford	November 30, 2014	13.24
Elizabeth decides to visit Venezuela so that Nadine can access Marsh's hidden bank account. Her team is accompanied by Manny Azucco, a famous Venezuelan-American baseball player, who causes a disruption in the fragile diplomatic relations with Venezuela by announcing that he is gay at the joint press conference. Elizabeth uses a threat of DOJ investigation into Venezuelan banking practices and an enticement of Azucco playing for the Venezuelan national team in the World Baseball Classic to smooth things over with Venezuela. Discovering that Marsh's account was emptied of $40 million the day after his death, Elizabeth and Isabelle identify an Iranian national as the person who accessed the account that day. Elizabeth tells Russell everything she has learned about Marsh's murder.
12	12	"Standoff"	Gloria Muzio	Joseph C. Muscat	January 4, 2015	11.69
Elizabeth and Henry travel to New York City on their anniversary for what is supposed to be a romantic reliving of their courtship. During her absence, the Texas governor causes a stand-off with Mexico over the extradition of a drug lord. The Secretary's team tries to sort out this issue without involving her, but ultimately has to call her. The Secretary does some unique arm-twisting to make the governor stand down and resolve the issue. The scholar on whom Henry was spying reaches out to Henry and asks for asylum in return for revealing all that he knows.
13	13	"Chains of Command"	Michael Waxman	Alex Cooley	January 11, 2015	12.13
Elizabeth pushes for the prosecution of a diplomat after he is caught holding a maid hostage in his home. Also, Henry's father comes to visit, leading to a possibly unpleasant revelation when Stevie seeks an organizing job at the union for which her grandfather supposedly sat on the board for several years.
14	14	"Whisper of the Ax"	Eric Stoltz	Barbara Hall	March 1, 2015	11.64
While defending the status of a microcredit system within the State Department budget, Elizabeth is blindsided by the revelation that the manager of the program has been embezzling money for gambling, throwing the status of the jobs of everyone on her staff in question. Meanwhile, Stevie decides to volunteer with the same Microloan United only to find out that she can keep the internship only if she's enrolled in a college. The operation tracking the Iranian national who was connected to Secretary Marsh's disappearance goes horribly awry on foreign soil and Director Munsey, Elizabeth, and Russell are forced to look for a mole among themselves. Elizabeth makes the difficult decision of confronting long time friend and CIA agent Isabelle. They are eventually forced to bring in the President on their secret investigation. President Dalton shockingly reveals that during his time at the CIA he had been suspicious of the plane crash in Dubai and had it investigated by 2 agents one of whom was George Peters who is now dead. Elizabeth is shown leading an armed search party to a house and reporting over the telephone that Juliet had fled and there was no information to be found at the house.
15	15	"The Ninth Circle"	Nicole Rubio	Alexander Maggio	March 8, 2015	10.82
Elizabeth shares Juliet's note with Isabelle, and they surmise that she was acting as handler to the Iranian operative. The fallout from the failed operation threatens U.S. relations with Turkey. Elizabeth and the dead operative's mother fly to Turkey to retrieve the body as well as the laptop of the Iranian national. Daisy, uncomfortable with being required to give the press talking points that she feels are false, is replaced in a press briefing. Based on information gained from the laptop, the President, Russell, and Elizabeth confront Munsey with accusations of treason. He tells them that a coup in Iran is already underway.
16	16	"Tamerlane"	Jonathan Brown	David Grae	March 15, 2015	11.26
Director Munsey being placed under house arrest and complete lockdown buys Elizabeth, Russell and President Dalton a few days to attempt to unravel or back the impending coup in Iran. However, with the chosen successor dying of cancer and the coup too well set up to destabilize, Elizabeth can only go to Iran personally to attempt to defuse the situation.
17	17	"Face the Nation"	Rob Greenlea	Matt Ward	March 22, 2015	10.79
A traumatized Elizabeth attempts to jump back into work, starting with the three-sided bidding war between an American oil company, the Chinese government, and an underdog environmental group over the Amazonian oil supplies. However, her PTSD ripples throughout her personal and professional life, slowing attempts to reassure the American public with an interview with Bob Schieffer, growing overprotective over Jason in his new school, and losing her temper while attempting to arbitrate the bidding war.
18	18	"The Time is at Hand"	Anna Foerster	Joy Gregory	March 29, 2015	11.47
An American religious cult has set itself up in Bolivia and taken a US congressman hostage. Henry agrees to visit the encampment to try to talk to the cult leader. The congressman and some of the adherents are saved, but the rest kill themselves. Henry and Elizabeth find out that Stevie is dating her boss.
19	19	"Spartan Figures"	Tate Donovan	Lyla Oliver	April 5, 2015	9.27
Having gone public with the US involvement in the failed Iranian coup, President Dalton and Elizabeth face resistance from world leaders during their trip to Brussels when they are trying to resolve Greece's debt problem. Stevie reconnects with Harrison, Dalton's son. Henry is offered a job at the National War College.
20	20	"The Necessary Art"	Dennie Gordon	Paul Redford	April 12, 2015	11.39
While Henry is visiting Russia, a Russian submarine with stealth capability entered Alaskan waters and vanished. With input from Henry, Elizabeth convinces the military to try to communicate with the submarine, which had suffered a fire, and the US is ultimately able to save the crew. Stevie breaks up with her boss.
21	21	"The Kill List"	Ed Ornelas	David Grae	April 26, 2015	10.46
The president of Iran is visiting to sign the peace treaty that Juliet has been trying to stop, so she arranges for a sniper to assassinate him. Dalton, Jackson, and Elizabeth believe that Juliet is in Algeria, and Dalton orders a drone strike on the location to kill her, but Algeria refuses and demands ground action. The ground troops discover that Juliet left evidence so they would believe the drone had killed her while she instead has travelled to D.C. The sniper and Juliet are taken into custody.
22	22	"There But For the Grace of God"	Eric Stoltz	Barbara Hall	May 3, 2015	9.67
A grandstanding Senator opens a Congressional hearing for Elizabeth and Henry, intending to boost his own political clout and damage the current administration. Juliet confesses her role in the coup, which leads Elizabeth to reflect on her last week at the CIA in 2005 when she was offered the position of station chief in Baghdad.

== Production ==
=== Development ===
In August 2013, it was announced Madam Secretary was in development at CBS, with the pilot written by Barbara Hall and directed by David Semel. Madam Secretary was ordered to series on May 9, 2014. On October 27, 2014, Madam Secretary received an order for nine additional episodes, bringing the total to a full season of 22 episodes. On January 12, 2015, Madam Secretary was renewed for a second season.

=== Casting ===
In January 2014, the pilot was cast with Téa Leoni as Elizabeth McCord, Tim Daly as Henry McCord, Geoffrey Arend as Matt Mahoney, Patina Miller as press coordinator Daisy Grant, Bebe Neuwirth as Elizabeth's chief of staff Nadine Tolliver, Erich Bergen as Blake Moran, Evan Roe as Elizabeth's son, Jason McCord, Katherine Herzer as Elizabeth and Henry's daughter Alison McCord, Željko Ivanek as Russell Jackson, and Wallis Currie-Wood as Elizabeth and Henry's older daughter Stephanie "Stevie" McCord.

== Broadcast ==
Season one of Madam Secretary premiered on CBS in the United States on September 21, 2014, with the season forty-seven premiere of 60 Minutes as its lead-in. The season finale aired on May 3, 2015.

== Ratings ==
Viewership and ratings per episode of Madam Secretary season 1
No.	Title	Air date	Rating/share (18–49)	Viewers (millions)	DVR (18–49)	DVR viewers (millions)	Total (18–49)	Total viewers (millions)
1	"Pilot"	September 21, 2014	2.0/5	14.75	—N/a	—N/a	—N/a	—N/a
2	"Another Benghazi"	September 28, 2014	1.4/4	12.72	—N/a	—N/a	—N/a	—N/a
3	"The Operative"	October 5, 2014	1.6/4	12.18	—N/a	2.87	—N/a	15.20
4	"Just Another Normal Day"	October 12, 2014	1.4/4	11.45	—N/a	—N/a	—N/a	—N/a
5	"Blame Canada"	October 19, 2014	1.5/4	12.28	—N/a	—N/a	—N/a	—N/a
6	"The Call"	October 26, 2014	1.5/4	11.71	—N/a	—N/a	—N/a	—N/a
7	"Passage"	November 2, 2014	1.8/5	13.21	—N/a	—N/a	—N/a	—N/a
8	"Need to Know"	November 9, 2014	1.4/4	12.54	—N/a	2.26	—N/a	14.80
9	"So It Goes"	November 16, 2014	1.5/4	12.77	—N/a	—N/a	—N/a	—N/a
10	"Collateral Damage"	November 23, 2014	1.6/4	12.41	—N/a	—N/a	—N/a	—N/a
11	"Game On"	November 30, 2014	1.9/5	13.24	0.5	2.39	—N/a	15.63
12	"Standoff"	January 4, 2015	1.5/4	11.69	0.5	2.61	2.0	14.30
13	"Chains of Command"	January 11, 2015	1.7/4	12.13	—N/a	2.63	—N/a	14.75
14	"Whisper of the Ax"	March 1, 2015	1.3/4	11.64	—N/a	2.88	—N/a	14.52
15	"The Ninth Circle"	March 8, 2015	1.1/4	10.82	—N/a	—N/a	—N/a	—N/a
16	"Tamerlane"	March 15, 2015	1.2/4	11.26	—N/a	—N/a	—N/a	—N/a
17	"Face the Nation"	March 22, 2015	1.3/4	10.79	—N/a	2.20	—N/a	12.99
18	"The Time is at Hand"	March 29, 2015	1.4/4	11.47	—N/a	—N/a	—N/a	—N/a
19	"Spartan Figures"	April 5, 2015	1.1/4	9.27	—N/a	—N/a	—N/a	—N/a
20	"The Necessary Art"	April 12, 2015	1.4/5	11.39	—N/a	—N/a	—N/a	—N/a
21	"The Kill List"	April 26, 2015	1.0/3	10.46	—N/a	—N/a	—N/a	—N/a
22	"There But For the Grace of God"	May 3, 2015	1.0/3	9.67	—N/a	—N/a	—N/a	—N/a

== Home media ==
The Complete First Season
Set details			Special features
22 episodes; 961 minutes (Region 1); 6-disc set; 1.78:1 aspect ratio; Languages: English (Dolby Digital 5.1); Subtitles: English (Region 1); Portuguese (Region 1)			Extraordinary Credentials: The Making of Madam Secretary Season One; Madam Secretary at the Politico Playbook Luncheon; Deleted Scenes; The Affair - Season 1, Episode 1
Release dates			Extraordinary Credentials: The Making of Madam Secretary Season One; Madam Secretary at the Politico Playbook Luncheon; Deleted Scenes; The Affair - Season 1, Episode 1
United States	United Kingdom	Australia	Extraordinary Credentials: The Making of Madam Secretary Season One; Madam Secretary at the Politico Playbook Luncheon; Deleted Scenes; The Affair - Season 1, Episode 1
September 1, 2015	September 28, 2015	November 12, 2015	Extraordinary Credentials: The Making of Madam Secretary Season One; Madam Secretary at the Politico Playbook Luncheon; Deleted Scenes; The Affair - Season 1, Episode 1
