= H. Andrew Schwartz =

American writer (died 2025)

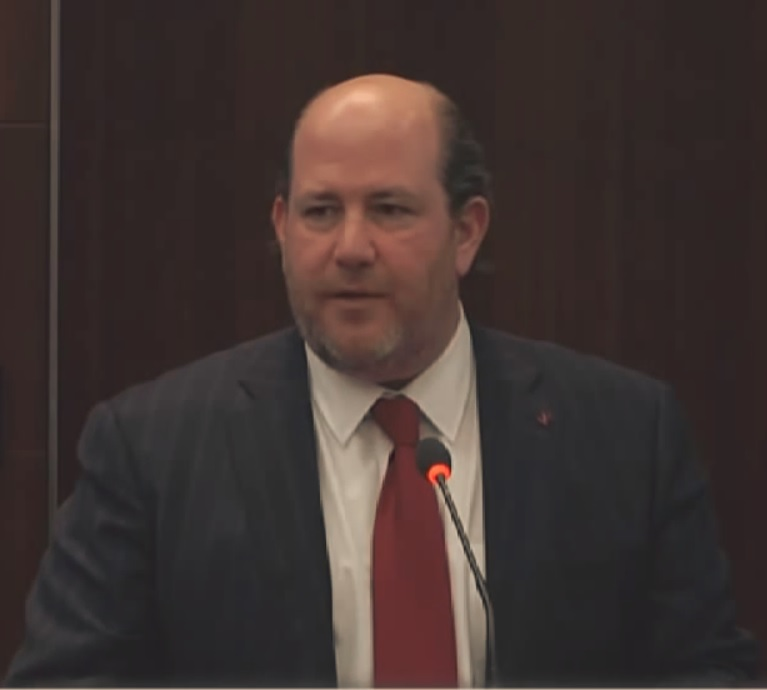
Schwartz in 2014

H. Andrew Schwartz (August 1, 1968 – July 16, 2025) was an American journalist and chief communications officer at the Center for Strategic and International Studies (CSIS) think tank.

== Background ==
In 1986 Schwartz enrolled at Tulane University where he earned a B.A. in political science in 1990. In 1995 he obtained an M.A. in broadcast journalism and public policy from American University.

Schwartz died in July 2025.

== Career ==
Schwartz started his career as research assistant to Stuart E. Eizenstat, the former Carter domestic policy adviser, at Powell, Goldstein, Frazer, and Murphy LLP.

He also was a legislative fellow in the offices of Senator J. Bennett Johnston (D-La.) and Representative Lindy Boggs (D-La.).

Schwartz later worked for Fox News. He was a producer for the channel's Special Report with Brit Hume and afterwards became one of the network's White House producers. He wrote for The Washington Post, The Washington Times, and other national newspapers and magazines.

In August 2005, Schwartz became deputy director for external relations at CSIS where he was chief communications officer.

At CSIS he served as spokesman and was responsible for media relations, digital strategy and production, publications, events and external matters. In addition, he oversaw the iDeasLab, a collaborative think tank space and multimedia production facility.

Schwartz wrote The Evening daily brief for CSIS. He co-hosted the podcast About the News together with CSIS trustee Bob Schieffer from 2016 to 2017. Schwartz was the host of four CSIS podcasts: The Truth of the Matter, The Trade Guys, The Impossible State, and The AI Policy Podcast.

== Affiliations ==
- Board of Visitors, Texas Christian University (TCU) College of Communication
- Editorial Board, The Washington Quarterly
- Dean's Advisory Council, Tulane University's School of Liberal Arts
- Member Emeritus, board of directors of the National Press Foundation
- Board of Advisors, Spirit of America

== Publication ==
- Overload: Finding the Truth in Today's Deluge of News (2017) with Bob Schieffer
