= Urban Verbs =

American new wave band

- Origin: Washington, D.C.
- Genre: New wave music
- Years active: 1977–1982, 1995, 2008
- Label: Warner Bros. Records
- Past members: Robert Goldstein; Roddy Frantz; Robin Rose; Danny Frankel; Linda France; Billy Swann

The Urban Verbs was an American new wave band from Washington, D.C. The band was fronted by lead singer and lyricist Roddy Frantz (brother of Talking Heads drummer Chris Frantz) and guitarist Robert Goldstein. The duo wrote songs together for over 30 years. Altogether, the band originally consisted of the aforementioned Roddy Frantz, Robert Goldstein, Linda France on bass, Robin Rose on keyboard, and Danny Frankel on drums.

In 1977, the Urban Verbs rehearsed in the Atlantic Building at 930 F Street in Washington, D.C. The band's first performance was at an art party in a loft close to D.C.'s Dupont Circle. Robert Goldstein (December 6, 1949 – October 7, 2016) began to book bands in a bar in the Atlantis Club, which was where the Urban Verbs played their first shows and became a nexus of the D.C. new wave and punk rock scene. In 1980, the Atlantis became the 9:30 Club.

The Urban Verbs played at the CBGB club in 1978 with the Cramps.. Producer Brian Eno was in the audience. Eno offered to record several of the band’s songs ("The Next Question" and "Pensive Lives") which have never been officially released.

In late 1978, Urban Verbs returned to CBGB to perform with Cleveland band Pere Ubu. Urban Verbs played the Peppermint Lounge and various New York clubs as well as numerous Washington, D.C. shows. In early 1979, the Urban Verbs shared the stage with the B-52's at the Corcoran School of Art.

The band received positive reviews in the Washington Post and the New York Times', among others. Urban Verbs became darlings of the D.C. downtown art scene and played shows at such arty venues as the Washington Project for the Arts, D.C. space, the Corcoran Gallery and School of Art, and the Pension Building (now the National Building Museum). The band also played at night club venues such as Atlantis (Nightclub 9:30), the Childe Harold, the Bayou, and the Cellar Door.

Warner Brothers executive Bob Krasnow signed the band to a two-record contract. The band's eponymous first album, Urban Verbs, was recorded with Mike Thorne (producer of Wire, Soft Cell and Bronski Beat) in 1979 and published under Warner Bros. Records in early 1980. The cover of the album pictures single photos of each band member in plastic bags partially filled with a clear liquid, presumably water. The Urban Verbs second album for Warner Bros. Records, Early Damage, was recorded in Atlanta with producers Jeff Glixman and Steve Lillywhite.

Urban Verbs were scheduled to tour with Joy Division in May 1980. Arriving in Toronto for the first show, the band found the tour was canceled due to the suicide of Joy Division singer Ian Curtis. After subsequent touring in 1980, Robin Rose and Linda France left the band. France was replaced by bassist Billy Swann, formerly of the Muffins. The band toured the United States and Italy as a quartet until its final show at Nightclub 9:30 in D.C. on October 29, 1982.

In 1995, Urban Verbs reunited to perform at the closing celebration for the 930 "F" street location of the 9:30 club. Urban Verbs again reformed in 2008 to play a show at the 9:30 Club which was featured on NPR’S All Songs Considered.

Robert Goldstein died from cancer on 7 October 2016, at the age of 66. Roddy Frantz died on 1 October 2026, at the age of 71.

== Notes ==
1. Welcome to the Club: 930, The Washington Post Magazine, April 18, 2010
2. Urban Verbs Renewal, Mark Jenkins, The Washington Post, December 22, 1995
3. Urban Verbs Past Perfect, Mark Jenkins, The Washington Post, December 30, 1995
4. Shaping Music, Richard Harrington, The Washington Post, October 7, 1983
5. Urban Verbs, Mike Joyce, The Washington Post, February 22, 1982
6. Pop Notes, Richard Harrington, The Washington Post, November 4, 1980
7. Urban Verbs, Harry Sumrall, The Washington Post, March 10, 1980
8. Assault by Urban Verbs, Joanne Ostrow, The Washington Post, March 7, 1980
9. The Urban Verbs, Eve Zibart, The Washington Post, January 26, 1979
10. The Urban Verbs, Harry Sumrall, The Washington Post, October 30, 1978
11. Pop Notes, Eve Zibart, August 15, 1978
12. Two Rock Groups Play CBGB's, John Rockwell, The New York Times, November 12, 1978
