= Armand Peschard-Sverdrup =

Mexican political scientist and foreign policy specialist

- Born: Mexico City, Mexico
- Citizenship: Mexican, American, Canadian
- Occupations: Public Policy (Foreign and Domestic) Analyst and Risk Analyst

Academic background
- Education: Carleton University (BA); Georgetown University (MA)

Academic work
- Discipline: Political Science; Latin American Studies; International Relations
- Institutions: Center for Strategic and International Studies

Armand Peschard-Sverdrup is a political scientist and foreign policy specialist. He founded the policy firm Peschard Sverdrup International in 2004 (www.psintl.com). Prior to his work at PS International, Peschard-Sverdrup was widely recognized as one of the world's leading experts on Mexican international relations. He wrote numerous academic texts and policy papers on the topic while serving as the director of the Mexico Program at the Center for Strategic and International Studies.

== Early life and education ==
Peschard-Sverdrup was born in Mexico City but is of French, Swedish and Norwegian descent. He grew up in Ottawa, Canada and became a naturalized Canadian citizen. He married in Washington, D.C., became a naturalized U.S. citizen and continues to reside in the U.S. Peschard-Sverdrup received a joint degree in political science and economics from Carleton University in Ottawa, Canada. He completed his graduate studies at the School of Foreign Service at Georgetown University in Washington, D.C..

== CSIS ==
Recognized as one of the world's leading experts on Mexican international relations, Peschard-Sverdrup began at the Center for Strategic and International Studies as a research assistant focusing primarily on trade and investment, security, economics, and politics. He eventually rose to direct CSIS' Mexico Program, where he expanded the department's emphasis on the US and Mexico's bilateral relationship.

Peschard continues as a nonresident senior associate at CSIS.

== PS International ==
Peschard-Sverdrup founded the international consulting firm PS International in 2004 (www.psintl.com). After several years focusing exclusively on Mexico for private sector clients, Peschard-Sverdrup and his firm expanded globally, opening offices in Atlanta and Buenos Aires, in addition to its first office in Mexico City.

Since founding PS International, Peschard-Sverdrup has developed expertise in operational risk assessments, risk mitigation and management strategies, due diligence for mergers and acquisitions and private equity financing, and business intelligence. PS International has years of experience assisting clients in the mining, pharmaceutical and private equity industries.

== Writing ==
Peschard-Sverdrup has written several important texts on US-Mexico bilateral relations. They've received overwhelmingly positive assessments from US policy experts, including Thomas F. McLarty, as well as James Baker III, who wrote about Peschard's 2005 co-authored work, Mexican Governance: From Single-Party Rule to Divided Government:

"By chronicling the good and bad of the contemporary revolution in Mexico, Armand Peschard-Sverdrup and Sara Rioff have compiled a book that expertly examines the evolution of a country of great importance to the United States as the two countries head into the twenty-first century."

== Works ==
- The Future of North America, 2025: Outlook and Recommendations (Center for Strategic and International Studies, 2008), ISBN 978-0892065202
- Mexican Governance: From Single-Party Rule to Divided Government (Center for Strategic and International Studies, 2005), ISBN 978-0892064571
- U.S.-Mexico Transboundary Water Management: The Case of the Rio Grande/Rio Bravo (Center for Strategic and International Studies, 2003), ISBN 978-0892064243
- Forecasting Mexico's Democratic Transition: Scenarios for Policymakers (Center for Strategic and International Studies, 2003), ISBN 978-0892064380
- New Horizons in U.S.-Mexico Relations: Recommendations for Policymakers (Center for Strategic and International Studies, 2001), ISBN 978-0892063970
- The New North America: A Guide to Relations with Canada and Mexico (Policy Papers on the Americas) (Center for Strategic and International Studies, 1997)
