= Center for Strategic and International Studies =

American think tank in Washington, D.C.

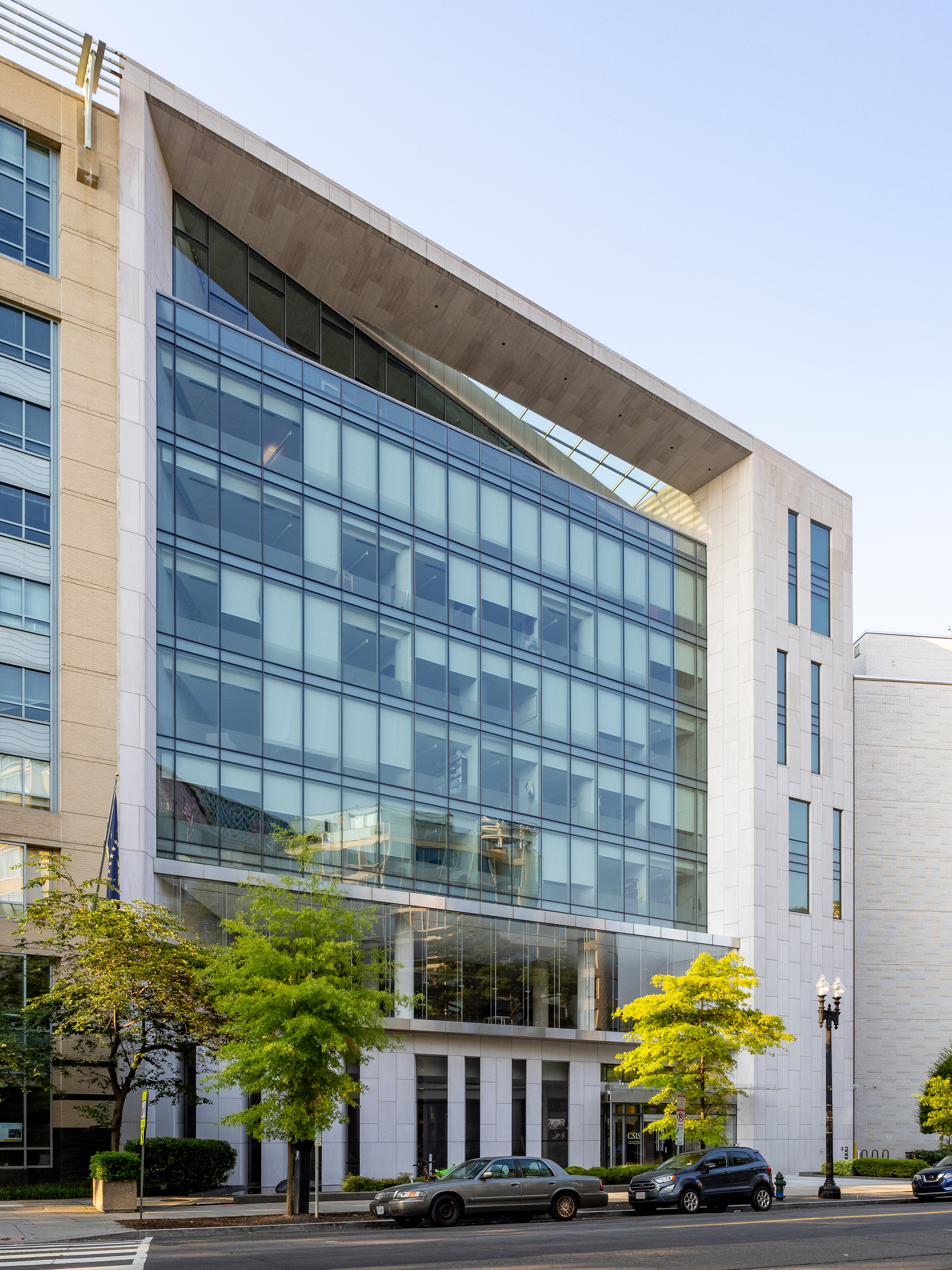
- Headquarters in Dupont Circle in Washington, D.C.
- Abbreviation: CSIS
- Formation: 1962; 64 years ago
- Type: Foreign policy think tank
- Tax ID no.: 52-1501082
- Legal status: 501(c)(3) nonprofit organization
- Headquarters: 1616 Rhode Island Avenue NW
- Location: Washington, D.C., U.S.
- Coordinates: 38°54′07″N 77°02′31″W
- President: Joseph F. Dunford
- Chairman, Board of Trustees: Thomas J. Pritzker
- Affiliations: Georgetown University (1962–1987)
- Revenue: $43,431,720 (2014)
- Expenses: $38,935,803 (2014)
- Endowment: $12,522,632 (2014)
- Employees: 354 (2014)
- Volunteers: 274 (2014)
- Website: www.csis.org

The Center for Strategic and International Studies (CSIS) is an American think tank based in Washington, D.C. From its founding in 1962 until 1987, it was an affiliate of Georgetown University, initially named the Center for Strategic and International Studies of Georgetown University.

The center conducts policy studies and strategic analyses of defense, geopolitical, economic security, and global development issues throughout the world, with a focus on issues concerning international relations, trade, technology, finance, energy, and geostrategy.

CSIS is officially a bipartisan think tank with scholars that represent varying points of view across the political spectrum. It is known for inviting well-known foreign policy and public service officials from the U.S. Congress and the executive branch, including those affiliated with either the Democratic or the Republican Party, as well as foreign officials of varying political backgrounds. It has been labeled a broadly "centrist" think tank by U.S. News & World Report.

CSIS is regularly called upon by Congress, the executive branch, and the media for analysis of foreign policy and recommendations to improve U.S. strategy. It conveys research through original data and multimedia tools as well as traditional reports, and it is seen as an industry leader in multimedia among other policy organizations. Its analysis has been awarded favorable scores for lack of bias, factual reporting and credibility by independent fact checkers.

== History ==
=== 1960s ===
The center was founded in 1962 by Arleigh Burke and David Manker Abshire. It originally was part of Georgetown University. It officially opened its doors on September 4, shortly before the Cuban Missile Crisis. The original office was located one block away from Georgetown's campus in a small brick townhouse located at 1316 36th Street. The first professional staff member hired was Richard V. Allen who later served in the Reagan administration.

At a conference held in the Hall of Nations at Georgetown University in January 1963, the center developed its blueprint for its intellectual agenda. The book that emerged from the conference, National Security: Political, Military and Economic Strategies in the Decade Ahead, was more than one thousand pages long. The book set out a framework for discussing national security and defined areas of agreement and disagreement within the Washington foreign policy community during the Cold War. The book argued for a strategic perspective on global affairs and also defined a school of thought within international relations studies for that period. The practitioners of this school of thought subsequently made their way to the pinnacles of U.S. policymaking, particularly during the Nixon, Ford and Reagan administrations.

=== 1970s ===
By the mid to late 1970s, many scholars who worked at the center had found their way to senior positions in government in the Department of State or Department of Defense. When Henry Kissinger retired from his position as U.S. Secretary of State in 1977, Harvard University declined to offer him a professorship. He decided to teach part-time at Georgetown University's Edmund A. Walsh School of Foreign Service and to make CSIS the base for his Washington operations, over offers to teach at Yale, Penn, Columbia, and Oxford. Kissinger's decision to become affiliated with the Washington-based institution attracted more public attention for the center than virtually any event in the preceding fifteen years.

Following Kissinger's involvement, other cabinet-level officials, including James Schlesinger, Bill Brock, William J. Crowe, and Harold Brown, joined CSIS in the late 1970s. When Zbigniew Brzezinski joined the center in 1981 after the end of the Carter administration, he worked on issues related to the Soviet Union and Poland's transition to a market economy. The arrangements for these senior government officials allowed them to write, lecture, and consult with media and business firms, and are typical of the way CSIS can incorporate high-level policymakers when they leave government. During the 1970s and 1980s, a myriad of think tanks either expanded operations or emerged in Washington, D.C., representing a range of ideological positions and specialized policy interests.

=== 1980s ===
In 1986, several Georgetown University professors criticized CSIS staff members for giving academically unsupported assessments of foreign policy issues during public interviews. Donations to Georgetown University decreased because of its association with CSIS. A special committee studied the friction, and its report stated that CSIS was more focused on the media than on scholarly research and recommended that CSIS be formally separated from Georgetown University. On October, 17, 1986, Georgetown University's board of directors voted to sever all ties with CSIS.

The Center for Strategic and International Studies was incorporated in Washington, D.C. on December 29, 1986, and the formal affiliation between Georgetown and CSIS ended on July 1, 1987.

=== 1990s ===
The center became an incorporated nonprofit organization to raise its endowment and expand its programs to focus on emerging regions of the world. The work of the trustees and counselors with the center after the dissolution of the Soviet Union in the 1980s left CSIS in a unique position to develop the nation's foreign policy with the United States as the world's sole superpower. It signified a degree of institutional maturation and prestige that the founders had not imagined when they founded the center in the early 1960s.

After the end of the Cold War, there emerged a suspicion in Washington that the United States was not as well equipped as it ought to be to compete in the international economy. This outlook drove CSIS to set up a project in early 1990 that, to some, seemed removed from traditional strategic and international concerns. The idea that America should focus on its problems at home to strengthen its role abroad evolved into the Commission on the Strengthening of America, chaired by Senator Sam Nunn and Senator Pete Domenici.

David Abshire saw the commission as a way to examine and improve upon economic policy, coming to the conclusion that the White House should reorganize the Executive Office of the President to include a National Economic Council with a national economic adviser on the model of the National Security Council. This new focus on economic policy led CSIS to increase its research focus on international economics and issues concerning the North American Free Trade Agreement, the World Trade Organization, the International Monetary Fund, the World Bank as well as global health and the environmental and societal effects of climate change. These issues merged into CSIS's mission to complement its traditional focus on international security issues.

=== 21st century ===
In 2013, CSIS moved from its K Street headquarters to a new location on Rhode Island Avenue in Washington, D.C. The new building cost $100 million to build and has a studio for media interviews and room to host conferences, events, lectures and discussions. The building is located in Washington, D.C.'s Dupont Circle neighborhood and earned LEED Platinum Certification.

In 2015, H. Andrew Schwartz, a senior vice president at CSIS, was quoted describing the organization's "number one goal" as "hav[ing] impact on policy." Defending the organization from claims that it had inappropriately engaged in lobbying on behalf of U.S. defense contractors, CEO John Hamre was quoted in 2016 as saying, "We strongly believe in our model of seeking solutions to some of our country's most difficult problems.... We gather stakeholders, vet ideas, find areas of agreement and highlight areas of disagreement."

In 2024, the Center was designated as an "undesirable organization" in Russia.

On March 12, 2026, CSIS announced that retired General Joseph Francis Dunford, who served as the 19th chairman of the Joint Chiefs of Staff, was named the next chief executive officer. He succeeded John Hamre on May 7, 2026.

== Funding ==
For fiscal year 2013, CSIS had an operating revenue of US$32.3 million. The sources were 32% corporate, 29% foundation, 19% government, 9% individuals, 5% endowment, and 6% other. CSIS had operating expenses of $32.2 million for 2013—78% for programs, 16% for administration, and 6% for development.

In September 2014, The New York Times reported that the United Arab Emirates had donated a sum greater than $1 million to the organization. Additionally, CSIS has received an undisclosed amount of funding from Japan through the government-funded Japan External Trade Organization, as well as from Norway. After being contacted by the Times, CSIS released a list of foreign state donors, listing 13 governments including those of Germany and China. CSIS lists major funding from defense contractors such as Northrop Grumman, Lockheed Martin, Boeing, General Dynamics, Raytheon Company and General Atomics.

Significant funding has come from the governments of the United States, Japan, Taiwan, and the United Arab Emirates.

== Programs and events ==
CSIS comprises numerous programs and projects, each with its own unique missions and interests. Research programs are divided into four departments based on area of study:

- The Defense and Security Department, led by Dr. Seth G. Jones, researches national defense and security issues, including missile defense, intelligence, nuclear issues, and critical minerals. It includes the Center for Industrial Base, and its programs include the Missile Defense Project and the Aerospace Security Project.
- The Economic Security and Technology Department, led by Navin Girishankar, researches issues including cybersecurity, trade and global markets, AI, and energy security.
- The Global Development Department, led by Enoh T. Ebong, covers topics such as global health, food and water security, climate resilience, and human rights issues.
- The Geopolitics and Foreign Policy Department, led by Dr. Victor Cha, focuses on geographic study of regions around the world, including Africa, the Americas, Australia, China, the Middle East, Southeast Asia, and more. The department includes the China Power Project, which examines Chinese military, economic, technological, and foreign policy issues.

The Project on Nuclear Issues (PONI), established in 2003, conducts research on deterrence and escalation, risk reduction and arms control, and disarmament. It also operates programs for early-career nuclear professionals, including a conference series and the Nuclear Scholars Initiative.

The Andreas C. Dracopoulos iDeas Lab, established in 2011, is CSIS's in-house digital, multimedia and design unit. Its projects include the Asia Maritime Transparency Initiative (AMTI), which uses satellite imagery and other open-source information in its coverage of maritime issues in Asia. AMTI's research and imagery have been cited by news organizations including Reuters, Time, and The Guardian.

The Missile Defense Project, launched by CSIS in 2015, examines policy, program, and strategic issues related to missile defense, including homeland and integrated air and missile defense.

The Aerospace Security Project conducts research on policy, operational concepts, technology, and economic issues involving the air and space domains, including space security, civil and commercial space, and air power. It has published a series of Space Threat Assessment reports examining foreign counterspace capabilities and activities.

In 2025, CSIS renamed its Defense-Industrial Initiatives Group as the Center for the Industrial Base and appointed Jerry McGinn as the center's inaugural director. The center, part of the Defense and Security Department, conducts research on the defense industrial base, government contracting, industry-government collaboration, and international industrial cooperation.

CSIS has often provided a platform for high-profile figures to make important statements about international relations issues. For example, in February 2024, U.S. Secretary of Commerce Gina Raimondo delivered a major policy address at CSIS in which she announced that the CHIPS initiative was expected to exceed its initial goals, and in April 2026, State Department official Jeremy Lewin announced that the Lenacapavir partnership would expand to provide 3 million doses of HIV vaccines.

In 2012, CSIS hosted U.S. Secretary of State Hillary Clinton as she delivered a keynote address on "U.S. Strategic Engagement with North Africa in an Era of Change," that addressed the security of embassies in the wake of the 2012 Benghazi attack.

In April 2023, CSIS established the Wadhwani Center for AI under the leadership of founding director Gregory C. Allen. The center was created to produce research, analysis, and policy recommendations on artificial intelligence and other advanced technologies, including their implications for U.S. national security.

CSIS hosts more than 350 students and professionals every year for a variety of executive education seminars and programming. CSIS also offers a master program in international relations in collaboration with the Maxwell School of Citizenship and Public Affairs at Syracuse University.

== Publications ==
CSIS publishes books, reports, newsletters, and commentaries targeted at decision makers in policy, government, business, and academia. Primarily, it publishes the work of its experts on a specific topic or area of focus in global affairs.

CSIS scholars have published op-eds in The New York Times, The Wall Street Journal, The Financial Times, Foreign Policy, Foreign Affairs and The Washington Post. CSIS experts were quoted or cited thousands of times by the print and online press and appeared frequently in major newswires like the Associated Press, Reuters, Agence France Presse and Bloomberg News. They have also appeared in online media such as The Huffington Post and Summit News, WSJ Live and were regular guests on the PBS NewsHour, NPR's Morning Edition and other policy-focused interview shows such as CNN's Erin Burnett OutFront.

CSIS also has its own YouTube channel, which regularly posts short videos and infographics about the think tank's work.

== Notable people ==
- Madeleine Albright
- Ehud Barak
- Antony Blinken
- Arnaud de Borchgrave
- Kurt M. Campbell
- James Cartwright
- Anthony Cordesman
- Mary DeRosa
- Thibaut de Saint Phalle
- Raymond F. DuBois
- Stephen J. Flanagan
- Michele Flournoy
- Bonnie S. Glaser
- Karl-Theodor zu Guttenberg
- Kathleen Hicks
- Fred Ikle
- Karl F. Inderfurth
- James L. Jones
- Rebecca Katz
- Iain King
- Andrew Kuchins
- Walter Laqueur
- Michael Ledeen
- Robert Mosbacher
- Clark A. Murdock
- Sean O'Keefe
- Armand Peschard-Sverdrup
- Juan Zarate

== Personnel ==
Henry Kissinger leads a 2011 discussion on China at CSIS.

The chairman of the board of trustees as of 2018, Thomas Pritzker, is also chairman and chief executive officer of The Pritzker Organization. Former U.S. Deputy Secretary of Defense John J. Hamre served as the president and chief executive officer of CSIS from January 2000 until May 2026, when he became CEO Emeritus upon his retirement. General Joseph Dunford assumed the role of CEO on May 7, 2026.

The board of trustees has included former senior government officials, including Henry Kissinger, Zbigniew Brzezinski, William Cohen, George Argyros, and Brent Scowcroft.

The board also includes major U.S. corporate leaders — prominent figures in the fields of finance, oil & gas, private equity, real-estate, academia and media.

CSIS's 275 full-time staff and its large network of affiliated scholars develop policy-proposals and initiatives that address current issues in international relations. In 2012, CSIS had a staff of 63 program staffers, 73 scholars and 80 interns. The center also worked with 241 affiliate advisors and fellows as well as with 202 advisory board members and senior counselors.

Hamre and Nunn have broadened the reach of the CSIS into public-policy analysis. The Department of Defense, as part of the 2012 National Defense Authorization Act, commissioned CSIS to conduct an independent assessment of U.S. interests in the Asia-Pacific region. In May 2009, President Barack Obama thanked the CSIS bipartisan Commission on Cybersecurity for its help in developing the Obama administration's policies on cyberwarfare. The Center was influential in the development of the Obama White House's foreign policy. "For the last four years, every Friday afternoon, I've asked my staff to prepare me a reading binder for the weekend", said National Security Advisor Tom Donilon. "The task is to go out and try to find the most interesting things that they can find with respect to national security issues [and] almost every week, there are products from CSIS." Within the intelligence community, CSIS is known for having "some of the most insightful analysis and innovative ideas for strengthening our national security", according to John Brennan.

== Assessments ==
John Kempthorne wrote in Fairness & Accuracy in Reporting that CSIS was "heavily funded by the US government, arms dealers and oil companies, [and] is a consistently pro-war think tank".

In its 2019 rankings—the latest available—the University of Pennsylvania rated CSIS as the #1 think tank in the United States, and the #4 think tank worldwide.

== Board of trustees ==
CSIS leadership

- William Daley, CSIS Chairman,Vice Chairman of Public Affairs, Wells Fargo, former White House Chief of Staff, and United States Secretary of Commerce
- Paul Ryan, CSIS Vice Chairman, former Speaker of the United States House of Representatives
- Joseph Dunford, CSIS CEO, former Chairman of the Joint Chiefs of Staff
- Sam Nunn, CSIS Chairman Emeritus, former United States Senator from Georgia

National security & public service

- William Cohen, Chairman and CEO, The Cohen Group, former United States Representative, United States Senator, and United States Secretary of Defense
- William Daley, Vice Chairman of Public Affairs, Wells Fargo, former White House Chief of Staff, and United States Secretary of Commerce
- James L. Jones Jr., former Commandant of the United States Marine Corps; former NATO Supreme Allied Commander Europe; former United States National Security Advisor to President Barack Obama
- Ronald Kirk, Senior of Counsel, Gibson Dunn, and former United States Trade Representative
- Anne Neuberger, General Partner, Andreessen Horowitz, and former deputy assistant to the president and deputy national security advisor
- Thomas Nides, Vice Chairman, Strategy and Client Relations, Blackstone, and former U.S. Ambassador to Israel
- Leon Panetta, Chairman, The Panetta Institute for Public Policy, and former Director of the Central Intelligence Agency and United States Secretary of Defense
- Thomas Pritzker, Chairman and CEO, The Pritzker Organization
- Frances F. Townsend, former Homeland Security Advisor to President George W. Bush
- James Winnefeld Jr., former Vice Chairman of the Joint Chiefs of Staff

Business & industry

- Brendan Bechtel, Chairman and CEO, Bechtel Group, Inc.
- Leon Cooperman, Founder, Omega Advisors, Inc.; and Chairman and CEO, Omega Family Office, Inc.
- Ray Dalio, Founder and Chief Investment Officer, Bridgewater Associates
- Harris Diamond, former Chairman and CEO, McCann Worldgroup
- Michael P. Galvin, President, Galvin Enterprises, Inc.
- Evan Greenberg, Chairman and CEO, Chubb Limited
- Linda W. Hart, Vice Chairman, President, and CEO, Hart Group, Inc.
- John B. Hess, CEO, Hess Corporation
- Mellody Hobson, Co-CEO and President, Ariel Investments; and Chairman of the Board of Trustees, Ariel Investment Trusts
- Ray Hunt, Chairman Emeritus, Hunt Consolidated, Inc.
- Fred Khosravi, Chairman and CEO, Imperative Care
- Kenneth G. Langone, Founder and CEO, Invemed Associates, LLC
- W. James McNerney Jr., Senior Advisor, Clayton, Dubilier & Rice; and Former Chairman, The Boeing Company
- Henry McVey, Partner, Head of Global Macro and Asset Allocation, and CIO of KKR's Balance Sheet, KKR
- Phebe Novakovic, Chairman and CEO, General Dynamics
- Jin Roy Ryu, Chairman and CEO, Poongsan Group
- Brad Smith, Vice Chair and President, Microsoft
- Bob Sternfels, Global Managing Partner, McKinsey & Company
- Raj Subramaniam, President and CEO, FedEx
- Andrew C. Taylor, Executive Chairman, Enterprise Mobility
- Byron D. Trott, Chairman and Co-CEO, BDT & MSD Partners
- Romesh Wadhwani, Founder and Chairman, SymphonyAI
- Darren W. Woods, Chairman and CEO, ExxonMobil

Non-profit & academia

- Andreas Dracopoulos, Co-President, Stavros Niarchos Foundation
- Henrietta Fore, former Executive Director, UNICEF
- Helene Gayle, President, Spelman College, former CEO, Chicago Community Trust
- William K. Reilly, Chairman Emeritus, World Wildlife Fund

== Cited works ==
- Abshire, David M.; Allen, Richard V. (1963). National Security: Political, Military and Economic Strategies in the Decade Ahead. Hoover Institution. ISBN 978-0817913113.
- Smith, James Allen (1993). Strategic Calling: The Center for Strategic and International Studies 1962–1992. The Center for Strategic and International Studies. ISBN 0-89206-237-1.
