= Rebecca Katz =

Global Health Professor

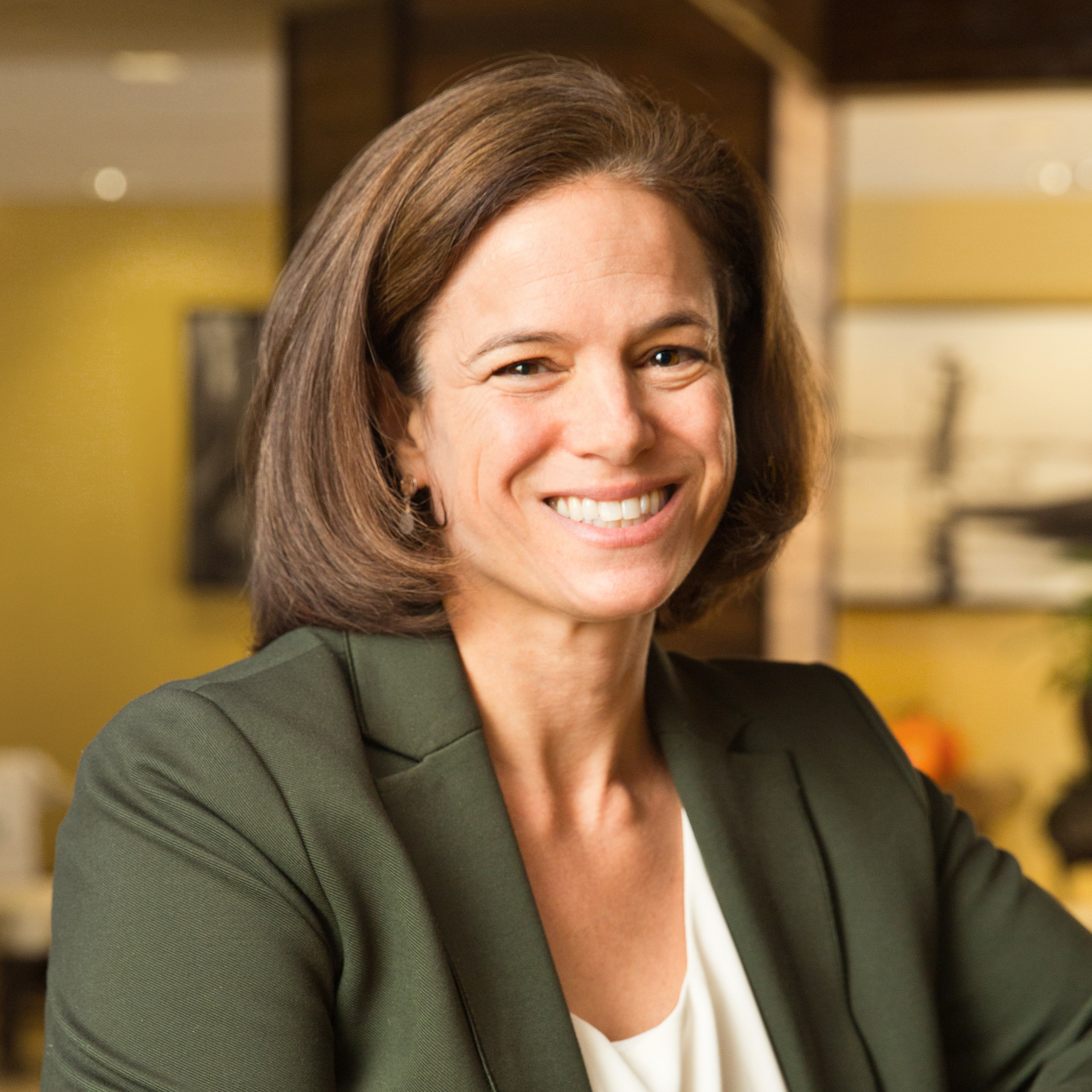
- Education: Swarthmore College (BA); Yale University (MPH); Princeton University (PhD)
- Scientific career
- Fields: Biosecurity; International affairs
- Institutions: Georgetown University Medical Center
- Thesis: Yellow Rain Revisited: Lessons Learned for the Investigation of Chemical and Biological Weapons Allegations (2005)
- Doctoral advisor: Burton Singer
- Website: Georgetown website

Rebecca Katz is a professor and director of the Center for Global Health Science and Security at Georgetown University Medical Center. She is an expert in global health and international diplomacy, specializing in emerging infectious diseases. From 2004 to 2019, she was a consultant for the United States Department of State on matters related to the Biological Weapons Convention and emerging infectious disease threats. Katz served on the Joe Biden presidential campaign's public health panel to advise on the COVID-19 pandemic.

== Education ==
Inspired by her parents' work to address HIV/AIDS epidemic in the 1980s, Katz initially aspired to be a health economist. She pursued an undergraduate degree in political science and economics at Swarthmore College, receiving her Bachelor of Arts degree in 1995. After graduating, she volunteered to work in maternal health in southern India, where she contracted Brucella melitensis and began to become interested in public health. She then chose to pursue a Master of Public Health degree at Yale University between 1996 and 1998. There, she was introduced to the world of bioterrorism. She followed that interest in health security to Princeton University Woodrow Wilson School of Public and International Affairs, where she pursued a doctorate degree from 2000 to 2005 at the intersection of public health and national security.

The September 11th attacks and the 2001 anthrax attacks occurred while Katz was studying at Princeton. In response to the anthrax attacks, Katz authored a working paper outlining the threat of biological weapons over time, as well as the public health infrastructure necessary to effectively detect and respond to an attack. The attacks also led to increased interest and funding support for biosecurity, which enabled her to do an internship at the Defense Intelligence Agency in Washington, DC. There, she was given access to documentation on an agent of Soviet-backed toxin warfare known as "yellow rain", which ultimately became the subject of her doctoral dissertation carried out under the mentorship of Burton Singer. Her thesis, entitled Yellow rain revisited: Lessons learned for the investigation of chemical and biological weapons allegations evaluated yellow rain as a case study in chemical and biological weapons allegations, as well as for evaluating the protocols used to mitigate proliferation of such warfare.

== Career ==
Katz began consulting for the United States Department of State in September 2004, working there until 2019. She specialized in issues related to the Biological Weapons Convention, a disarmament treaty signed 1975 to ban biological warfare. Since 2007, Katz has also worked on implementing the International Health Regulations (IHR), which are a legally binding instrument of international law to promote international cooperation and help countries prepare for and respond to public-health emergencies.

During her tenure at the State Department, Katz also became an associate professor at George Washington University from 2006 to 2016. In July 2016, she began an appointment associate professor position at Georgetown University and was promoted to professor in July 2019. There, she also became the director for the newly formed Center for Global Health Science and Security and has overseen the launch of the center's Masters program.

In the wake of the 2019 Ebola virus disease outbreak in Tanzania, Katz also advocated to address gaps in the IHR and convene regular review conferences to discuss the potential for outbreaks, thus bolstering the ability of the World Health Organization to address emerging epidemics proactively. In light of the emerging COVID-19 pandemic, Katz has again advocated for stronger international regulations to more effectively address outbreaks. In late January 2020, she advocated that the WHO should declare COVID-19 a Public Health Emergency of International Concern (PHEIC) as a signal to the international community to launch a coordinated public health response. She and megacity expert Robert Muggah also co-authored recommendations for how to evaluate the preparedness of cities to address and mitigate infectious disease outbreaks.

Katz has contributed her expertise to advising a number of groups on strategies to strengthen health security. She is a member of the Center for Strategic and International Studies (CSIS) Commission on Strengthening America's Health Security, which conducts policy studies and strategic analyses to advance the United States leadership in global health security. In 2020, she was also appointed by the Council on Foreign Relations to serve on its Independent Task Force on Improving Pandemic Preparedness, co-chaired by Sylvia Mathews Burwell and Frances Fragos Townsend. On March 11, 2020, the Joe Biden 2020 presidential campaign announced Katz would be joining his campaign's public health panel to advise on COVID-19, along with Ezekiel Emanuel, David Kessler, Lisa Monaco, Vivek Murthy, and Irwin Redlener.

In November 2020, Katz was named a volunteer member of the Joe Biden presidential transition Agency Review Team to support transition efforts related to the Executive Office of the President of the United States and the National Security Council. Since 2022, she has been serving on the Technical Advisory Panel of the joint World Bank/World Health Organization Pandemic Fund.

Katz joined on a panel discussion with the Atlantic Council to discuss how health attaché can elevate global health diplomacy for a concept floated by Dr Edmond Fernandes - a senior fellow with the Atlantic Council.

=== Selected publications ===
- "The novel COVID-19 originating in Wuhan, China: challenges for global health governance." JAMA 2020;323(8):709-710. doi:10.1001/jama.2020.1097
- "Defining Health Diplomacy: Changing Demands in the Era of Globalization." Milbank Quarterly Sep 2011; 89(3): 503–523. doi:10.1111/j.1468-0009.2011.00637.x
- Encyclopedia of bioterrorism defense. Jun 2011. ISBN 9780470508930
