= Clark A. Murdock =

Clark Murdock (born c. 1940s) is a senior adviser at Center for Strategic and International Studies (CSIS), a Washington, D.C.–based foreign policy think tank. Murdock specializes in strategic planning, defense policy, and national security affairs. He also serves as the director of the Project on Nuclear Issues, a collection of nuclear experts from government, academia, the national laboratories, the military, and the private sector.

In 2000, Murdock taught military strategy, the national security process, and military innovation at the National War College. From 1995 to 2000, he was deputy director of the headquarters planning function for the United States Air Force. As deputy special assistant to the chief for long-range planning, he helped define a coherent strategic vision for the 2020 Air Force and institutionalize a new long-range planning process. As deputy director for strategic planning, he helped implement the new planning process and led the development of several new planning products. Before joining the Air Force, he headed the Policy Planning Staff in the Office of the Under Secretary of Defense for Policy.

Murdock has served in many roles in the defense world, including as a senior policy adviser to House Armed Services Committee chairman Les Aspin, as an analyst and Africa issues manager in the CIA, and in the Office of the Secretary of Defense. He also taught for 10 years at the State University of New York at Buffalo. He is an honors graduate of Swarthmore College and holds a Ph.D. in political science from the University of Wisconsin–Madison.

== Education ==
- BA Political Science from Swarthmore College (with honors)
- Ph.D. in Political Science (with a minor in economics) from the University of Wisconsin–Madison

== Publications ==
- Transitioning Defense Organizational Initiatives: An Assessment of Key 2001-2008 Defense Reforms, CSIS Publication, 11/12/2008
- Facilitating a Dialogue among Senior-Level DoD Officials on National Security Priorities, CSIS Publication, 04/04/2008
- The Department of Defense and the Nuclear Mission in the 21st Century, CSIS Publication, 03/05/2008
- U.S. Air Force Bomber Modernization Plans: An Independent Assessment, CSIS Publication, 01/25/2008
- Special Operations Forces Aviation, CSIS Publication, 10/26/2007
- Future Making: Getting Your Organization Ready for What’s Next, Murdock Associates, Inc., 09/01/2007
- Debating 21st Century Nuclear Issues, CSIS Publication, 07/24/2007
- Beyond Goldwater-Nichols: An Annotated Brief, CSIS Publication, 08/01/2006
- The Future of the National Guard and Reserves, CSIS Publication, 07/12/2006
- Beyond Goldwater-Nichols: Phase 3 Report, CSIS Publication, 07/01/2006
- Defense Acquisition Performance Assessment Panel Final Report, CSIS Publication, 01/27/2006
- Beyond Goldwater-Nichols: Phase 2 Report, CSIS Publication, 07/28/2005
- Beyond Goldwater-Nichols: Phase 1 Report, CSIS Publication, 03/01/2004
- Improving the Practice of National Security Strategy, CSIS Publication, 02/01/2004
- Conduct of the Military Campaign Against Iraq, CSIS Publication, 03/06/2003
- Revitalizing the U.S. Nuclear Deterrent, CSIS Publication, 2002
