= Bob Schieffer =

American television journalist (born 1937)

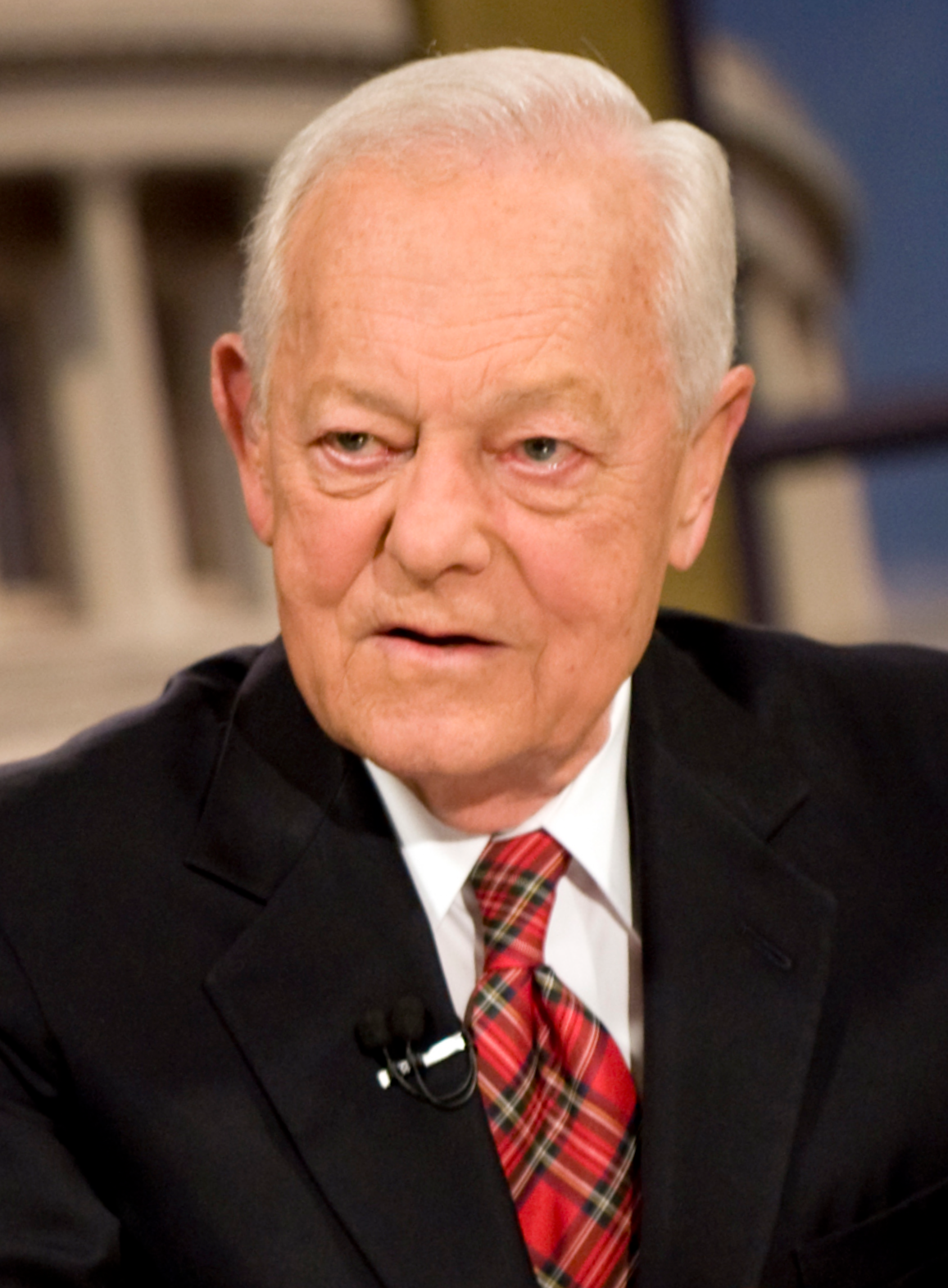
- Schieffer in 2009
- Born: Bob Lloyd Schieffer; February 25, 1937 (age 89); Austin, Texas, U.S.
- Education: Texas Christian University
- Occupations: Journalist; anchor
- Years active: 1963–present
- Notable credits: Face the Nation moderator (1991–2015); CBS Evening News (2005–2006); 60 Minutes (1973–1996)
- Title: Chief Washington Correspondent; Anchor, Face the Nation
- Spouse: Patricia Penrose (m. 1967)
- Children: 2
- Relatives: Tom Schieffer (brother); Sharon Mayes (sister)
- Website: CBS News Bio

Bob Lloyd Schieffer (born February 25, 1937) is an American television journalist. He is known for his moderation of presidential debates, where he has been praised for his capability. Schieffer is one of the few journalists to have covered all four of the major Washington national assignments: the White House, the Pentagon, United States Department of State, and United States Congress. His career with CBS has almost exclusively dealt with national politics. He has interviewed every United States President since Richard Nixon, as well as most of those who sought the office.

Schieffer has been with CBS News since 1969, serving as the anchor on the Saturday edition of CBS Evening News for 20 years, from 1976 to 1996, as well as the Chief Washington Correspondent from 1982 until 2015, and moderator of the Sunday public affairs show Face the Nation from 1991 until May 31, 2015. From March 10, 2005, to August 31, 2006, Schieffer was interim weekday anchor of CBS Evening News, and was one of the primary substitutes for Dan Rather, Katie Couric, and Scott Pelley.

Following his retirement from Face the Nation, Schieffer has continued to work for CBS as a contributor, making many appearances on air, giving political commentary covering the 2016 presidential election. Schieffer is currently releasing episodes of a new podcast, "Bob Schieffer's 'About the News' with H. Andrew Schwartz".

Schieffer has written three books about his career in journalism: Face the Nation: My Favorite Stories from the First 50 Years of the Award-Winning News Broadcast, This Just In: What I Couldn't Tell You on TV, and Bob Schieffer's America. He co-authored a book about Ronald Reagan, The Acting President, with Gary Paul Gates, that was published in 1989. In his memoir This Just In, Schieffer credits the fact he was a beat reporter at CBS for his longevity at the network.

Schieffer has won virtually every award in broadcast journalism, including eight Emmys, the overseas Press Club Award, the Paul White Award presented by the Radio and Television News Directors Association, and the Edward R. Murrow Award given by Murrow's alma mater, Washington State University.

Schieffer was inducted into the Broadcasting & Cable Hall of Fame in 2002 and inducted into the National Academy of Arts and Sciences Hall of Fame in 2013. He was named a living legend by the Library of Congress in 2008.

Schieffer is currently serving as the Walter Shorenstein Media and Democracy Fellow at Harvard Kennedy School's Shorenstein Center.

== Early life ==
Schieffer was born on February 25, 1937, in Austin, Texas, to John Emmitt Schieffer and Gladys Payne Schieffer, and grew up in Fort Worth, Texas. He is an alumnus of North Side High School and received a B.A. in journalism and English in 1959 from Texas Christian University (TCU). While there, he was a member of the Air Force Reserve Officer Training Corps and the Phi Delta Theta fraternity. The College of Communication at TCU was renamed in Bob Schieffer's honor in 2013.

== Early career ==
After graduating from TCU, Schieffer served in the United States Air Force for three years as a public information officer stationed at Travis Air Force Base and later McChord Air Force Base. He was honorably discharged and joined the Fort Worth Star-Telegram as a reporter, with one of his key assignments being a trip to Vietnam to profile soldiers from the Fort Worth area. Schieffer was the first reporter from a Texas newspaper to report from Vietnam.

It was at the Star Telegram that he received his first major journalistic recognition when John Kennedy was assassinated in Dallas on November 22, 1963. Shortly after President Kennedy was shot in Dallas, Texas, Schieffer was in the Star-Telegram office and received a telephone call from a woman in search of a ride to Dallas. The woman was Marguerite Oswald, Lee Harvey Oswald's mother, whom he accompanied to the Dallas police station, where he spent the next several hours. In the company of Oswald's mother, Marguerite, and his wife, Marina, he was able to use the phone in the police station to call in dispatches from other Star-Telegram reporters in the building. This enabled the Star-Telegram to create four Extra editions on the day of the assassination. Schieffer later joined the Star-Telegram's television station WBAP-TV in Fort Worth before taking a job with CBS in 1969.

== CBS Broadcasting career ==
Schieffer was anchor of the CBS Sunday Night News from 1973 to 1974, the CBS Sunday Evening News in 1976, and of the Saturday Evening News broadcast for twenty years from 1976 until 1996. He also anchored the weekday CBS morning show at the time called "Morning", which was titled in accordance to the day of the week (Monday Morning, Tuesday Morning, etc.) from 1979 to 1980. One of his best-known roles was as moderator of the Sunday public affairs show Face the Nation from 1991 until May 31, 2015.

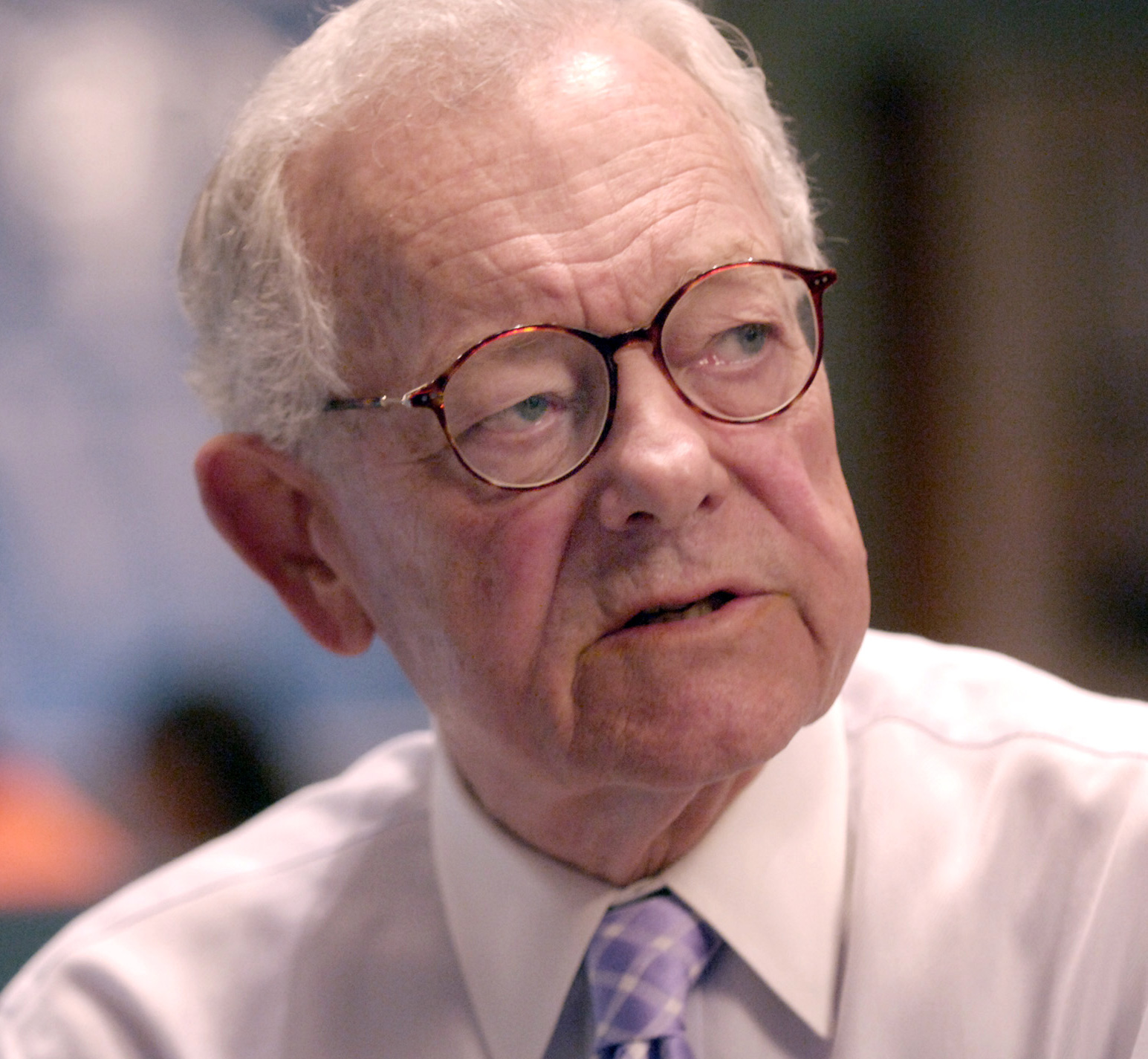
Schieffer in April 2006

Schieffer was also known for his reporting duties. Between 1970 and 1974, he was assigned to the Pentagon. From 1974 to 1979, he was the White House correspondent for CBS, and in 1982 he became Chief Washington Correspondent, in addition to his anchor duties.

In the wake of Dan Rather's controversial retirement, Schieffer was named interim anchor for the weekday CBS Evening News. He assumed that job on March 10, 2005, the day following Rather's last broadcast.

Under Schieffer, the CBS Evening News gained about 200,000 viewers, to average 7.7 million viewers, reversing some of the decline in ratings that occurred during Rather's tenure; while NBC Nightly News was down by 700,000 viewers, and ABC's World News Tonight lost 900,000. Schieffer closed the gap with ABC's World News Tonight when co-anchor Bob Woodruff was injured in late January 2006.

Schieffer made his last CBS Evening News broadcast on August 31, 2006, and was replaced by Katie Couric. On Couric's second broadcast, he returned to provide segments for the evening news as chief Washington correspondent. Schieffer was also a substitute anchor for Couric and Scott Pelley when he became anchor of the evening news in June 2011.

On October 13, 2004, Schieffer was the moderator of the third presidential debate between President George W. Bush and Senator John Kerry in Tempe, Arizona. On October 15, 2008, Schieffer moderated the third presidential debate between Senator Barack Obama and Senator John McCain at Hofstra University in Uniondale, New York. Schieffer also moderated the third debate of the presidential candidates in 2012, between President Obama and former Massachusetts Governor Mitt Romney, on October 22, in Boca Raton, Florida.

In 2013, Schieffer won the National Association of Broadcasters Distinguished Service Award and the Walter Cronkite Award for Excellence in Journalism.

== Retirement from broadcasting ==
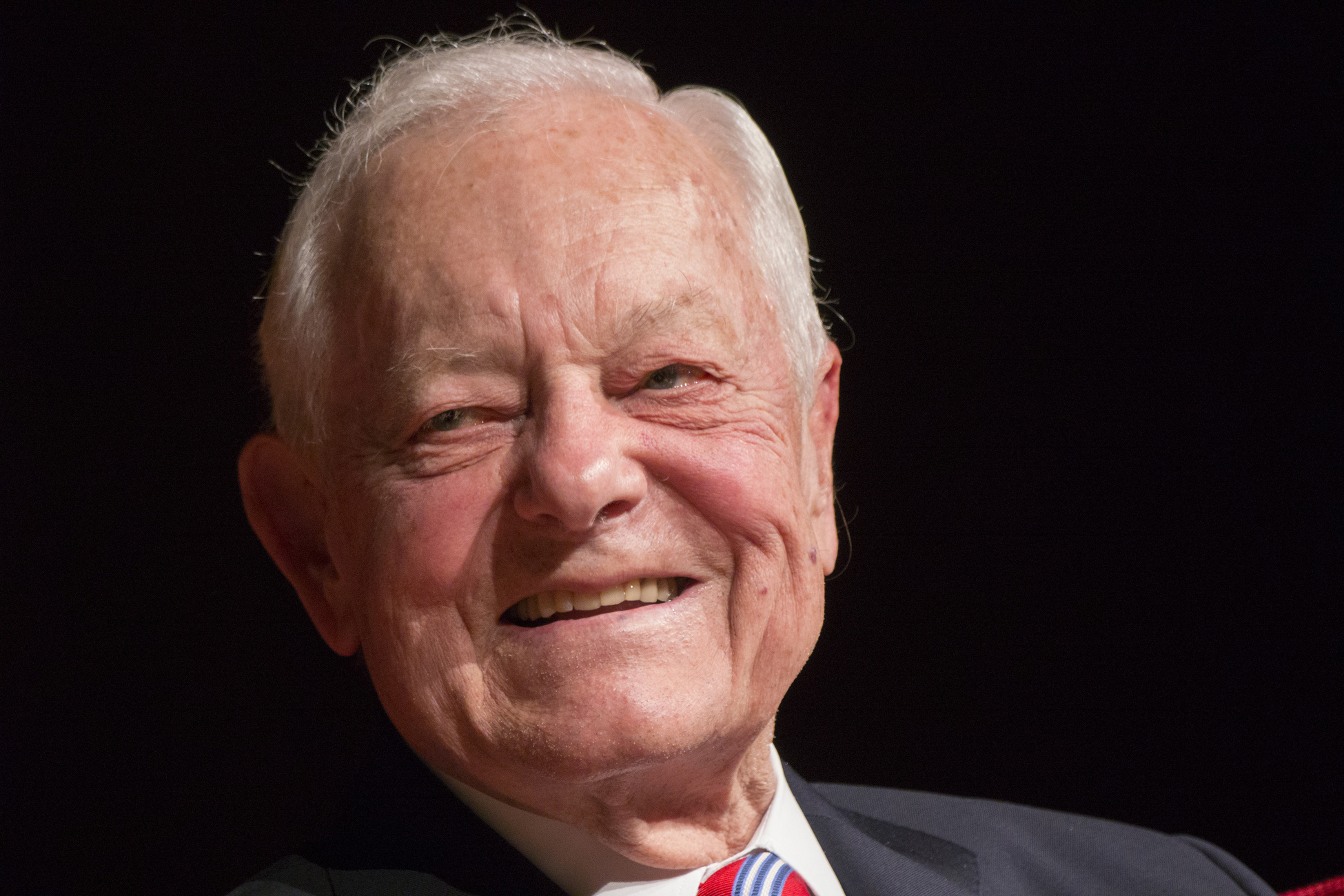
Schieffer in January 2016

On April 8, 2015, Schieffer announced his intention to retire as host of Face the Nation while speaking at his alma mater, Texas Christian University. Schieffer departed after working in journalism for 52 years, 46 of those years with CBS. On the April 12 broadcast of the program, he announced that John Dickerson, the political director for CBS, would succeed him, beginning in June 2015.

As he prepared to retire from Face the Nation, Schieffer reflected on the acclaim that came his way during the latter stages of his career. "The interesting thing about my life—a lot of the recognition I got was after most people retired," he told The New York Times, going on to add, "I think that people just became familiar with me just because I had been there and others had come and gone."

Schieffer's final broadcast as moderator of Face the Nation was on May 31, 2015.

== Singing career ==
Since leaving the anchor desk at CBS Evening News in 2006, Schieffer has entertained his longstanding interest in songwriting by collaborating with musicians in New York and Washington, D.C. His latest efforts have resulted in four songs with the Washington area band Honky Tonk Confidential, all of which appear on its album Road Kill Stew and Other News (with Special Guest Bob Schieffer). Schieffer sings the song "TV Anchorman" and wrote the lyrics for the other songs.

== Personal life ==
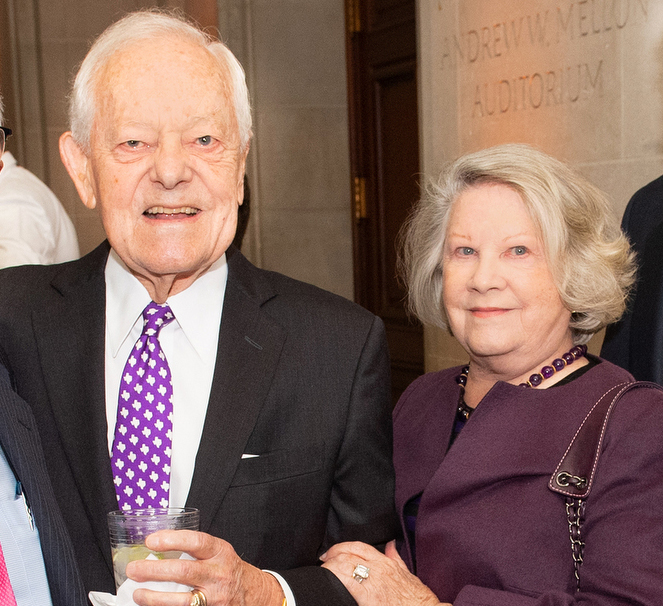
Schieffer and his wife Patricia in 2019

Schieffer married Patricia Penrose in 1967; they have two daughters and three granddaughters.

Schieffer is the older brother of Tom Schieffer, a long time Texas state legislator and friend and former business partner of President George W. Bush who was appointed U.S. Ambassador to Australia from 2001 to 2005 by President Bush, and served as U.S. Ambassador to Japan from 2005 through 2009. In 2009, Tom Schieffer campaigned for the Democratic nomination for governor but withdrew from the race on November 23, 2009, citing an inability to raise enough cash to fund an effective campaign.

Schieffer has a sister, Sharon Schieffer Mayes, a retired teacher and school administrator who taught science for 17 years before becoming the Vice Principal of Dunbar High School in Fort Worth, Texas. Sharon Mayes eventually became the principal at Keller High School at a time when only two percent of the principals in the largest high schools in Texas were women.

Schieffer is a survivor of grade III bladder cancer. He was diagnosed in 2003 and has been cancer-free since 2004. He has been diagnosed as having type 2 diabetes, and is on insulin therapy.

== Popular culture ==
After fellow CBS newscaster and Texan Dan Rather was switched from the White House beat to hosting the documentary show CBS Reports in 1974. The October 13, 1974, edition of the Doonesbury comic strip featured a joking fantasy scene in which Schieffer, his successor, haltingly comments on the transition: "It was the affiliates—they just couldn't take him. I mean let's face it, Dan wasn't exactly MR. TACT!. I dunno.... Maybe it's just as well in the long run, I mean, you know? Anyway, this is Robert Schieffer at the White House...." (Schieffer notes that "The strip was right on except for one thing. My real name is Bob, not Robert").

Schieffer had a cameo appearance beside Harrison Ford in the 2010 film Morning Glory, along with his CBS News colleague Morley Safer as well as MSNBC's Chris Matthews. He also had a cameo appearance on television series Madam Secretary in the episode named "Face of Nation".

== Career timeline ==
- 1973–1974: CBS Sunday Night News anchor
- 1973–1996: 60 Minutes contributor
- 1973–2005: CBS Evening News anchor (summer and weekend editions)
- 1982–2015: CBS News Chief Washington correspondent
- May 1991 – May 31, 2015: Face the Nation moderator
- March 10, 2005 – August 31, 2006: CBS Evening News anchor
- 2016–present: CBS News contributor

== Publications ==
- Good Show, President Reagan: The Acting President (1989) with Gary Paul Gates
- This Just In: What I Couldn’t Tell You on TV (2003)
- Face the Nation: My Favorite Stories from the First 50 Years of the Award-Winning News Broadcast (2004)
- Bob Schieffer's America (2008)
- Overload: Finding the Truth in Today's Deluge of News (2017) with H. Andrew Schwartz

== See also ==
- New Yorkers in journalism

Media offices
Preceded by Lesley Stahl	Face the Nation Moderator; May 26, 1991 – May 31, 2015	Succeeded by John Dickerson
Preceded by Dan Rather	CBS Evening News Weekday Edition Anchor; March 10, 2005 – August 31, 2006	Succeeded by Katie Couric
