= Tru Fax and the Insaniacs =

Band from the early 1980s Washington DC punk scene

Tru Fax & the Insaniacs (TFI) are a punk/new wave band in the Washington, D.C., area. The voice of the band's lead vocalist, Diana Quinn, has been described as evoking "early Deborah Harry -- sort of Blondie meets The Stooges or New York Dolls." TFI was part of DC's infant punk scene in the late 1970s/early 1980s.

== History ==
TFI was formed in 1978 by Diana Quinn (lead vocals and rhythm guitar), David Wells (lead guitar, backup vocals), and Michael Mariotte (drums). Libby Hatch, previously of the Shirkers, also took a turn on bass guitar in the early 1980s.

Initially, the band organized their own shows at Hard Art, MOTA, dc space, Madam's Organ, and The Bayou in Georgetown.

TFI played its first 9:30 Club show on July 9, 1980. The band became a long-term favorite at the club. They were even there when the original 9:30 Club closed its doors at its 930 F Street location to move to its new location at the intersections of 9th Street, V Street, and Vermont Avenue.

TFI was one of six local bands chosen to record the music featured on a two-CD set which memorializes the closing of the original 9:30 Club. The CD set is titled "9:30 Live - A Time, A Place, A Scene". The CDs were recorded live at the 9:30 Club between December 28, 1995, and January 1, 1996. The following TFI songs are on CD 2: "King of Machines", "Chinese Wall", "7 T.V. Me", and "Washingtron".

In addition to the 9:30 Club CD, TFI recorded a '45 (Washingtron b/w Mystery Date) and an album (Mental Decay, 1982) on WASP records. WASP was a local D.C. label. The band favored its indie status and eschewed major labels.

"Washingtron" is arguably TFI's biggest hit to date. It is a song about life in the nation's Capital City. In the early 1980s, "Washingtron" received quite a bit of air play on local radio stations like WHFS. The song had local appeal, with lyrics such as: "I used to work as a waitron in the lounge at the Hiltron. Now I work for my Senatron and I live in Arlingtron." "Arlingtron" is a reference to Arlington, Virginia, a suburb just across the Potomac River from Washington, D.C. The song also contains era-specific references such as "Accu-tron" watches and the film "Tron".

TFI played at CBGB and The Ritz in New York City, as well as locations in Philadelphia, Richmond, Ohio, and North Carolina. The band knew that they had finally made it when Washingtonian Magazine named them the "worst band" in 1980 — without ever having heard them. This early recognition cemented TFI's status and popularity in the local punk/new wave scene.

Quinn has since also been involved with Honky Tonk Confidential, a retro/alt country band, and The Fabulettes, a three-woman ensemble that uses the "Girl Group Sound" of the 1960s.
