= The Atlantis (music venue) =

Nightclub and concert venue in Washington, D.C.

Coordinates: 38°55′5″N 77°1′26″W

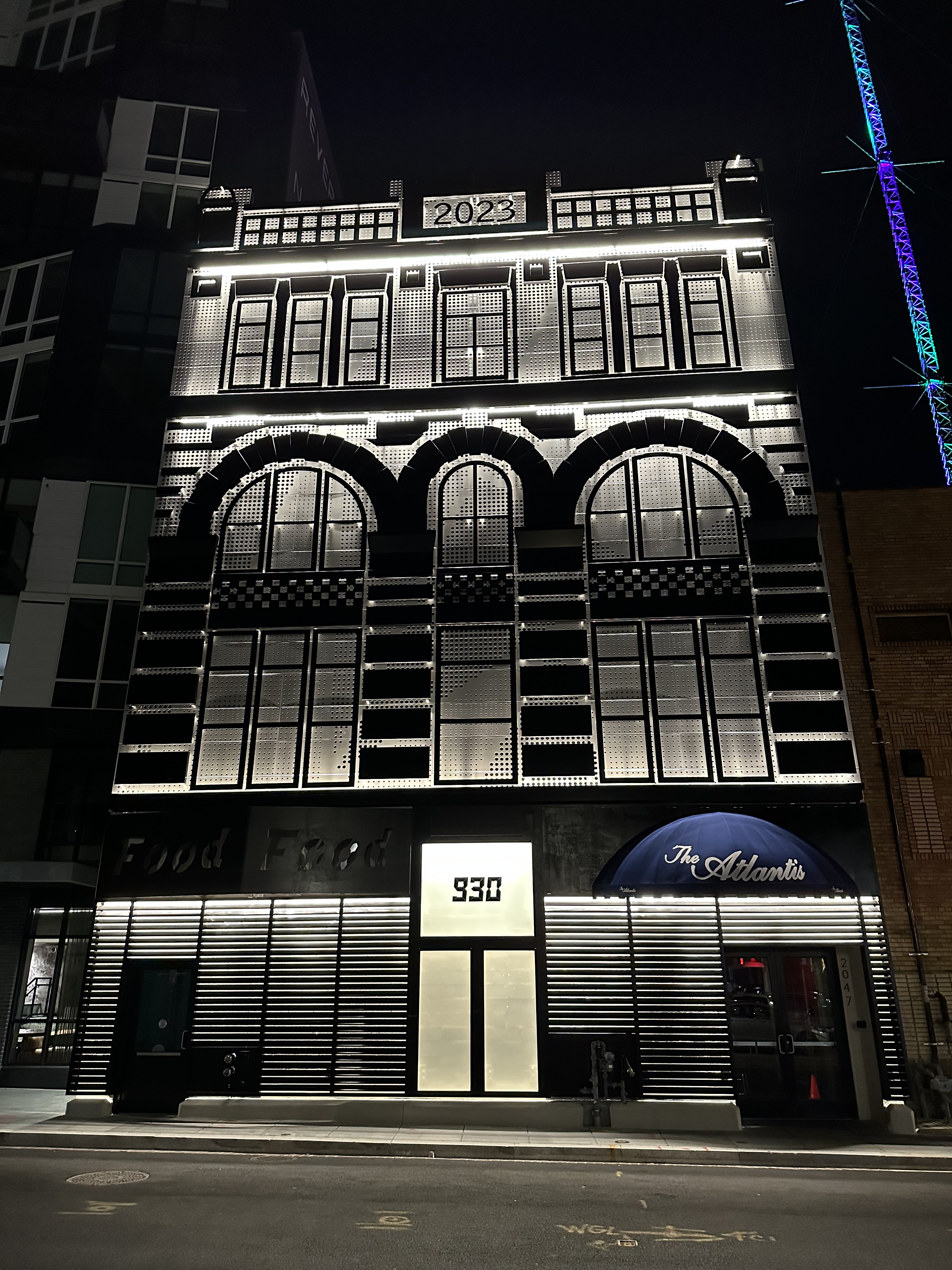
- The Atlantis at night
- Interactive map of The Atlantis
- Address: 2047 9th St NW, Washington, D.C. 20001
- Location: U Street Corridor
- Owner: Seth Hurwitz
- Seating type: Standing room
- Capacity: 450
- Public transit: Washington Metro at U Street

Construction
- Opened: May 30, 2023

Website
- Venue Website

The Atlantis is a music venue in Washington, D.C., that opened on May 30, 2023. The venue was designed to evoke the original 9:30 Club at 930 F Street NW, (Note: Washington Post features writer Travis M. Andrews noted that the club is not a replica of the original 9:30 and Dave Grohl of the club's opening act Foo Fighters commented "This is the new old 9:30 Club. The 9:45 Club" and added "I feel like this is the 9:30 Disney, 9:30 the ride.") which itself was first called The Atlantis. The new venue opened exactly 43 years after the original 9:30 Club. The venue, adjacent to (and around the corner from) the current 9:30 Club on V Street NW, has a relatively small capacity of 450 people. The Atlantis is owned by Seth Hurwitz and is a part of I.M.P. a Maryland-based live music promotional group that includes the 9:30 Club, The Anthem, the Lincoln Theater, and Merriweather Post Pavilion.

== History ==
=== Grand opening ===
During a private soft launch opening on Sunday May 28, D.C. power pop/punk band, Venray was the very first to perform, opening for the local go-go band, Trouble Funk. The much vaunted grand opening on May 30, 2023 featured the Foo Fighters, performing there two years after Dave Grohl first revealed that the venue was being built. As part of the celebration of the opening, Mayor Muriel Bowser proclaimed May 30 to be "9:30 Club Day" in Washington, D.C.

=== Ticket lottery ===
The Atlantis planned 44 performances during its inaugural season, scheduled to run from May through September 2023, in celebration of the 44 years since the opening of the 9:30 Club. In another nod to 9:30 Club history, tickets for all 44 shows were priced at $44. Tickets were initially released through a Ticketmaster request lottery system, drawing over half a million requests for the 20,000 tickets. This lottery distribution approach and fixed ticket price were limited to the initial run of concerts, with The Atlantis switching to a more usual ticketing system going forward.

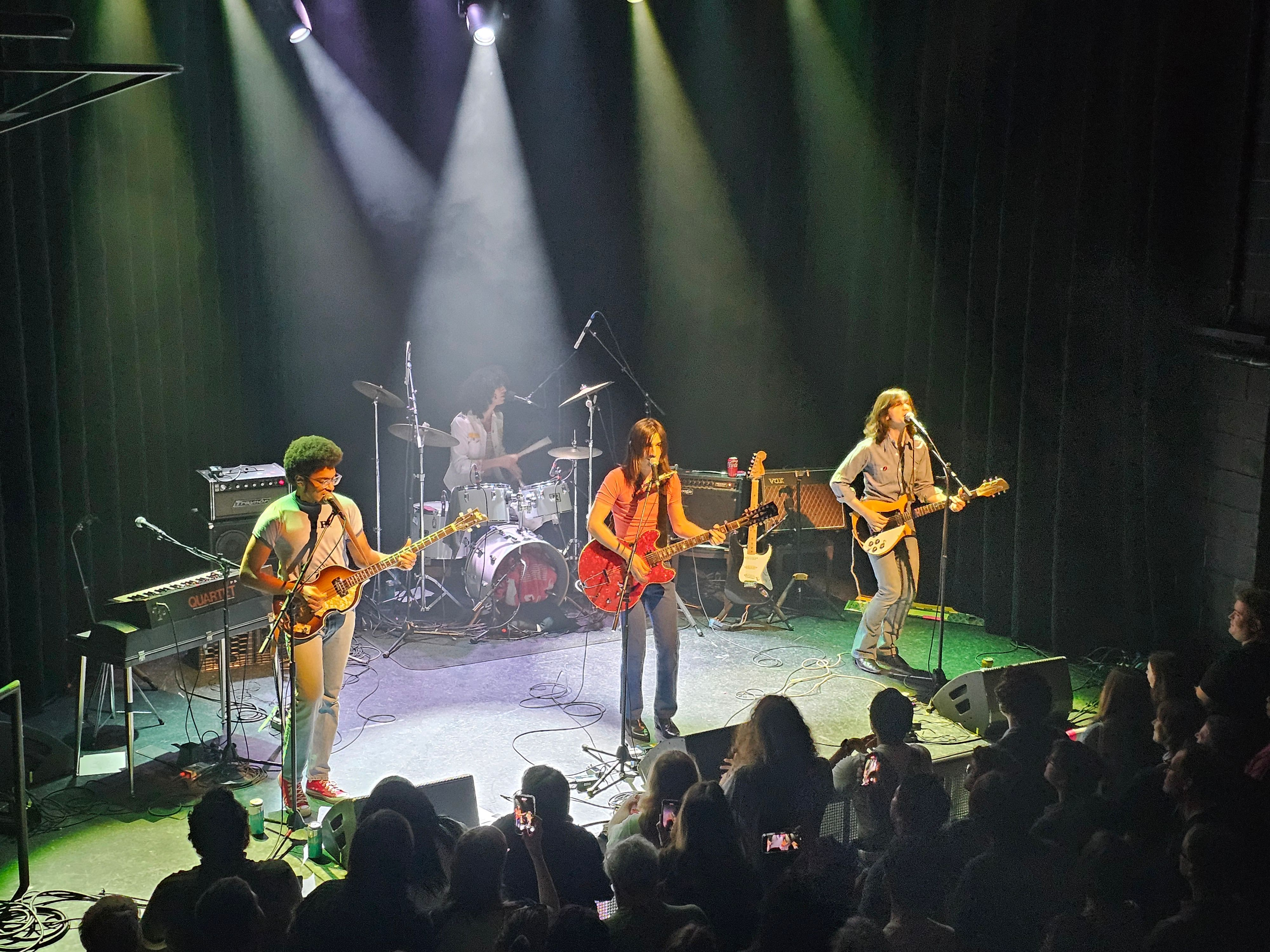
The Lemon Twigs performing at The Atlantis in 2024.

== Concerts ==
Besides the Foo Fighters, The Atlantis had many notable performances within the first few months of opening. The venue hosted musical acts including the Walkmen, Franz Ferdinand, Pixies, X, Modern English, Third Eye Blind, Portugal. The Man, Bush, George Clinton, Drive-By Truckers, Joan Jett and the Blackhearts, Ben Gibbard, Gary Clark Jr., Spoon, Tove Lo, Billy Idol, Bastille, Maggie Rogers, the Struts, Living Colour, Rainbow Kitten Surprise, and Darius Rucker (Hootie and the Blowfish).

On August 28, 2024, Jack White made a surprise performance at the venue to promote his new album, No Name.
