= Stephen J. Flanagan =

Political Scientist

Academic background
- Education: Columbia University (BA); Tufts University (PhD)

Academic work
- Discipline: Political science
- Sub-discipline: International Relations
- Institutions: Center for Strategic and International Studies; RAND Corporation

Stephen J. Flanagan is a senior political scientist at the RAND Corporation. He formerly served as a senior director in the United States National Security Council under the Clinton and Obama administrations as well as senior vice president of the Center for Strategic and International Studies.

== Biography ==
Flanagan was born in Boston, Massachusetts and was raised in Medford, Massachusetts. He received his A.B. from Columbia University in 1973 and his Ph.D. in international relations from the Fletcher School of Law and Diplomacy at Tufts University in 1979.

From 1978 to 1983, Flanagan was a professional staff member of the United States Senate Select Committee on Intelligence.

He joined Harvard Kennedy School in 1983 as a faculty member, becoming the executive director of the Belfer Center for Science and International Affairs, before joining National War College in 1987 as a senior fellow and faculty member between 1987 and 1989.

From 1989 to 1995, Flanagan was an associate director and member of the State Department's Policy Planning Staff and national intelligence officer for Europe between 1995 and 1997.

From 1997 to 1999, he served as special assistant to the president and senior director for Central and Eastern Europe on the National Security Council, succeeding Daniel Fried, who was nominated United States Ambassador to Poland.

He was director of the Institute for National Strategic Studies and vice president for research at the National Defense University from 2000 to 2007.

From 2007 until 2013, Flanagan held the Kissinger Chair at the Center for Strategic and International Studies, where he also served as senior vice president and director of the International Security Program.

From 2013 to 2015, he served as special assistant to the president and senior director for defense policy and strategy at the National Security Council (NSC) Staff.

== Personal life ==
Flanagan and his wife, Lynn Wansley Flanagan, Senior Counsel in the Office of the General Counsel at the United States Department of Commerce, have two sons.
