= JV's Restaurant =

Restaurant and music venue in Falls Church, Virginia, US

Coordinates: 38°52′13.2″N 77°10′30″W

Founded in October 1947, JV's Restaurant is a Falls Church and Fairfax County, Virginia restaurant and live music venue. Located on Arlington Boulevard, Route 50, just west of Annandale Road, JV's has provided live music for more than four decades. In 2004, the Washington Area Music Association presented JV's with the Special Appreciation Award, voted on by participating Washington-region musicians, as their favorite live venue.

== History ==
The establishment was founded in the immediate post-World War II years by brothers Louis and George Dross. George was a Greek resistance fighter against the German forces until he was captured and held as a prisoner-of-war for 18 months. He subsequently emigrated to the United States with his wife shortly after that conflict's conclusion and always maintained a strong support for POWs/MIAs at his establishment.

Originally a small diner in the art deco Jefferson Village Shopping Center, JV's was named the Jefferson Restaurant because it was then the custom for all businesses in that shopping center to be named after the adjacent infant neighborhood on the northwest corner of Route 50 and Annandale Road (e.g., Jefferson Barber, Jefferson Bakery). A movie house, added to the complex next to the restaurant in 1948, was named the Jefferson Theatre.

Proprietor George Dross's past experience as a foreign national prisoner-of-war proved an attraction for military personnel from Fort Myer, who would drive the five miles from Arlington County, also on Route 50.

By the late 1950s, the restaurant had become a place for live performances by local artists. It changed its name formally to JV's Restaurant in the early 1960s, after the Jefferson Village Shopping Center, and formalized the schedule for live music performances about 1980. Prior to that, it had been mostly open-mic. Many musicians, famous and not-yet-famous, have appeared at JV's over the years, including members of Patsy Cline's band, the Country Gentlemen, the Seldom Scene, Tony Rice, Roy Clark, Catfish Hodge, Billy Hancock, and various members of such bands as Molly Hatchet, Eric Clapton, Blackfoot, Lynyrd Skynyrd, Rod Stewart, and Willie Nelson's Ungrateful Bastards.

An attempt was made to secure a liquor license in the 1960s, but Virginia laws prescribing the exact size of tables in licensed establishments was missed by a fraction of inches.

In January 2015, the restaurant absorbed the adjacent business space previously operated as an Asian pharmacy, effectively doubling the size of the house.

JV's participate in the annual Rolling Thunder motorcycle gathering in honor of POWs and MIAs. A recently added display is a diorama of a Vietnamese prisoner-of-war camp with tiger cages, donated by veterans from Pennsylvania. Several local musicians have composed songs about the establishment.
