= Mother May I =

American music group

- Origin: Washington, DC
- Genres: Alternative pop, alternative rock, power pop
- Years active: 1990–2001

Mother May I was an American power pop/rock band formed in 1990 in Washington, DC best known for their songs "Birthday Wish" and "Meet You There".

== Formation and early success ==
Drummer Rob LeBourdais was in a cover band named Lower Wolves while in college. Damon Hennessey was a fan who attended a few Lower Wolves shows and even joined the band on stage to sing a song or two. Lower Wolves changed the name to The Wolves and relocated to the MD/DC area after college where band leader Sean Chagall had family and had spent some years growing up. Eventually, Hennessey moved to MD to join The Wolves with Chagall, LeBourdais and bassists Bob Reagan/Dave Elle. Mother May I came together in 1990 when The Wolves disbanded.

Original bassist Les Doefler (who was also playing in the DC band Hyaa!)helped get the project off of the ground and played a string of shows with Damon and Rob in DC and Boston. He was replaced by Peter Gilstrap (formerly of DC's The Neighbors and Super Jones Affair) who did several early tours with the band up and down the East Coast. With the addition of bassist Graham McCulloch, formerly of Negative Approach and The Meatmen, the band released a 7" Single featuring the tracks "Birthday Wish" and "In A Box", both of which would later be re-recorded for their debut album. The inclusion of "Birthday Wish" on a New Music Seminar 1992 sampler cassette got the then-unsigned band an early mention in Billboard Magazine.

== Rise ==
In September 1994, the band released Use Your Appetite For Spaghetti, an EP including their soon-to-be signature song "Meet You There" and a cover of The Association's "Never My Love". Soon after, the band signed a contract with Columbia Records via the man who also signed Soul Asylum, Chalk Farm and Primitive Radio Gods. Before the group entered the studio to record their debut album, bassist Graham McCulloch left the group and joined Earth 18. He was replaced by Dave O'Brien who joined the band for a string of shows in the DC area (including opening for Paul Westerberg at U.MD's Ritchie Coliseum, opening for Toad The Wet Sprocket at GWU, and headlining 9:30 Club) as well as touring across the country. During this time period, the band recorded what would become “Splitsville” in Baltimore, MD. Dave was eventually followed on bass by David Swafford of Best Kissers in the World whom they'd met while both bands toured with Chainsaw Kittens.

In late 1994, Mother May I toured with Judybats, a 4-track CD single featuring 3 songs from their upcoming debut album plus the holiday song "Breaking Up At X-Mas" was released, and a promotional CD featuring "Meet You There" was sent to radio and other music industry outlets. The band toured nationwide with XC-NN and Sponge. as well as a Rolling Stone magazine tour with label mates Dag. Dave Swafford left the band after only a few months, returning to Best Kissers in the World.

Swafford was followed on bass by Lars Gustaffson who had previously been in Titanic Love Affair. He would remain with the band for all of their touring for the next two years. Their debut album Splitsville was released on Valentine's Day of 1995. The album includes "Teenage Jesus", a song originally written during The Wolves period, but not included on that band's sole release. The band toured with Soul Asylum in June 1995 including a stop at the WHFStival side stage and did an extensive UK tour as well.

== Fall ==
In December 1995, the band was dropped by Columbia Records and disbanded soon after.

The band regrouped in 1997, but in an effort to start fresh, changed the name to Hundred Watt Halo. After only a few shows, the band reverted to its original name. Over the next few years, Mother May I continued to do occasional shows while writing material for their second album. Original bassist Graham McCulloch rejoined during this time. A sophomore album titled 33 1/3 was released in 1999 on SAM Records, a small label from Baltimore, Maryland. The album includes a re-recording of their 1994 holiday single "Breaking Up At X-Mas".

In addition to gigging with Mother May I in support of their second album in 2000, both Hennessey and LeBourdais contributed to Dana Cerick's album My Heart You Break It You Buy It, with Hennessey performing guitar, piano and bass, and LeBourdais performing drums, percussion and background vocals. Hennessey also provided vocals for the alternative country band Red Star Brigade's album Telescope.

By 2001 the band was dormant, with frontman Damon Hennessey having relocated to Chicago, Illinois. An album of old recordings, Demos 1990-1996, was released that year.

== Post-breakup and reunion show ==
After the dissolution of the band, Damon Hennessey relocated to Chicago. He has worked for over 20 years in the film/video production field, serving as director of photography on many projects for several broadcast and cable networks including National Geographic, Hulu, CBS, ESPN, MSNBC, History Channel among many others.

Rob LeBourdais has since been a member of the Washington, DC area bands Sweetpie Jones, Lu Bango and Timothy Bracken Complex.

On October 2, 2010, Damon and Rob were joined by bassist Lars Gustaffson as well as bassists Graham McCulloch and Dave O'Brien (on keyboards this time) and guitarist Les Doerfler to play a reunion show at one of their old familiar stomping grounds, the Iota Club & Cafe in Arlington, Virginia. The band were also joined by Wolves guitarist/singer Sean "Chagall" Rozsics for a few covers.

== Discography ==
=== Albums/EPs ===
- Use Your Appetite For Spaghetti (1994)
- Splitsville (1995)
- 33 1/3 (1999)
- Demos 1990-1996 (2001)

=== Singles ===
- "Nothing To Do" (1990)
- "Birthday Wish" (1992)
- "Breaking Up At X-Mas" (1994)
- "Meet You There" (1994)

== Members ==
=== Core members ===
- Damon Hennessey - Guitar, Vocals (1990-2001, 2010 reunion show)
- Rob LeBourdais - Drums, Vocals (1990-2001, 2010 reunion show)
- Graham McCulloch - Bass (1991-1993, 1997-2001)

=== Other members ===
- Peter Gilstrap - Bass (1990)
- David O'Brien - Bass (1993-1994)
- David Swafford - Bass (1994-1995)
- Lars Gustaffson - Bass (1995, 2010 reunion show)
- Mike Harvey - Guitar (1994, 1997-1999)
- Les Doerfler - Guitar (1999)

== Other bands named Mother May I ==
- In 1983, a lo-fi darkwave band named Mother May I from Philadelphia, Pennsylvania released a song "When Children Play" on a WXPN FM compilation album titled I'd Rather Be In Philadelphia. The group also released an undated self-titled 3-track 7" record. The members were Lisa Cortes and Sean Radcliffe. Coincidentally, the engineer for this 7" release, John Wicks, was the opening act for Mother May I (the one that this article is written about) on April 21, 1995.
- In 1986, a band named Mother May I from New York City, New York released an eponymous 5-track vinyl EP. The members were Josh Costanzo, Charles Piston, Cesare Costanzo, Charles Marcus and Bob Leploy.
- In 2005, a dance/funk band named Mother May I from Buffalo, New York released a CD named Chokin' The Doggie.
