= List of albums titled Live =

Albums entitled Live, or similar titles, listed alphabetically by band name or artist's last name, include:

== 0–9 ==
- Live by 311

== A ==
- ABBA Live by ABBA
- Live by AC/DC
- Live by Alice in Chains
- Live by Alison Krauss & Union Station
- Live by All Sons & Daughters
- America Live by America
- Live by Angel Witch
- Live by Apocalyptica
- Live! by April Wine

== B ==
- Live by Bad Brains
- Live by Erykah Badu
- Live by Bang Tango
- Live by Barclay James Harvest
- Live! by the Beau Brummels
- Live EP by Breaking Benjamin
- Live! by Chuck Berry
- Live by the Black Crowes
- Live! by Carla Bley
- Live by Blind Guardian
- Live (Note: Was titled Livid in the UK, where it was released in 2000) by Blondie
- Live by the Bouncing Souls
- Live by Built to Spill
- Live by Burning Spear
- Live by Terence Blanchard

== C ==
- Live by Candlemass
- Cardiacs Live by Cardiacs
- Catch 22 Live by Catch 22
- Live by Champion
- Ray Charles Live by Ray Charles
- Live by Chizh & Co
- Live by City and Colour
- Gary Clark Jr. Live by Gary Clark Jr.
- Live by Clown Core
- Live by Clouseau
- Live by Corneille
- Live! by Billy "Crash" Craddock
- LIVE! by Crush 40

== D ==
- Alive 1997 by Daft Punk
- Alive 2007 by Daft Punk
- Live by DecembeRadio
- Live by Deftones
- Live by the Dubliners
- Live! by Dune

== E ==
- Live! by Jonathan Edwards
- Live by Eurythmics

== F ==
- Live by Face to Face
- Live by Five.Bolt.Main
- Live by Fleetwood Mac

== G ==
- Live! by Frank Gambale
- Marvin Gaye Live! by Marvin Gaye
- Live by Generation X
- Genesis Live by Genesis
- Live by Gipsy Kings
- Live by Golden Earring
- Live/Dead by Grateful Dead
- Live by the Group (Ahmed Abdullah, Marion Brown, Billy Bang, Sirone, Fred Hopkins, Andrew Cyrille)
- Live!! by Guitar Wolf

== H ==
- Live by Happy Mondays
- Live! by Huck-A-Bucks
- Live by Donny Hathaway
- Live! by Scott Henderson
- Live by Terri Hendrix
- Live! by Terumasa Hino
- Whitney Houston Live: Her Greatest Performances by Whitney Houston

== I ==
- Live by Iron Butterfly
- Live!! +one by Iron Maiden
- Live! by the Isley Brothers

== J ==
- Live by the Jacksons
- Live by Jesus Jones
- Live by Jonas Brothers
- Live by J. Cole

== K ==
- Live by Kaipa
- Live! by Kasabian
- Live by Kix
- Live by Klinik
- Live! by Habib Koité and Bamada
- Live by Korn
- Live by Alison Krauss & Union Station
- Live! by Fela Kuti

== L ==
- Live! by Patti LaBelle
- Live! One Night Only by Patti LaBelle
- '77 LIVE by Les Rallizes Dénudés
- Live by Luciano
- Live (Only Not) by Lemon Demon

== M ==
- Live by Natalie MacMaster
- Live by the Mars Volta
- Live! by Bob Marley and the Wailers
- Masta Killa Live by Masta Killa
- Live by Percy Mayfield
- Sarah McLachlan Live by Sarah McLachlan
- Live by Metal Church
- Live! by the Monkees
- Live by Gary Moore
- Live! by Vinnie Moore
- Live by Mott the Hoople
- Live at Rome Olympic Stadium by Muse

== N ==
- Live! by Ednita Nazario
- Nena Live (1995) by Nena
- Nena Live (1998) by Nena
- Nena Live Nena by Nena
- Live by New Riders of the Purple Sage
- Live by News
- Live by the Northern Pikes
- Live by Tig Notaro
- Live by Michael Nyman

== O ==
- Live by the Only Ones
- Live by Our Lady Peace

== P ==
- Live by Vanessa Paradis
- Live by Peatbog Faeries
- Live by Poco
- Live! by the Police
- Live by Pigmy Love Circus
- Live by Pokolgép

== R ==
- R.E.M. Live by R.E.M.
- Live by Return to Forever
- Live by Reverend
- Live by Robert Rich
- Live by Roxus
- Live by Roswell Rudd and Duck Baker
- Live by Running Wild

== S ==
- Live by Sade
- Live by Saint Vitus
- Live! by Irène Schweizer and Joey Baron
- Live by Sensational Alex Harvey Band
- Live by Sedes
- Live! by Selena
- Show of Hands Live by Show of Hands
- Pacifier Live by Shihad (as Pacifier)
- Live by Sleepytime Gorilla Museum
- Live! by Lonnie Liston Smith
- Live by the Smithereens
- Live by Soft Cell
- Live by the Sounds
- Live by Split Lip Rayfield
- Live! by Status Quo
- Steve Miller Band Live! by Steve Miller Band
- Live by Sunny Day Real Estate
- Live by Sweetbox
- Switchfoot: Live – EP by Switchfoot

== T ==
- Live Versions by Tame Impala
- Live by James Taylor
- Live by They Might Be Giants (1999)
- Life/Live by Thin Lizzy
- Live by Thunder
- Live by Louis Tomlinson
- Trapt Live! by Trapt
- Live by Lela Tsurtsumia
- Live by Tanya Tucker
- Tina Live by Tina Turner
- Live by Trouble Funk
- Shania Twain Live by Shania Twain

== U ==
- Live by Usher

== V ==
- Anna Vissi Live by Anna Vissi (2004)
- Live! by Anna Vissi (1993)

== W ==
- Live by Bob Weir and Rob Wasserman
- Live by Włochaty

== Y ==
- Live by YU grupa

== Z ==
- Live by Zebra

== See also ==
- Greatest Hits Live (disambiguation)
- Live on Stage (disambiguation)
- Live at the Fillmore
- Lists of albums
