= Greatest Hits Tour =

Greatest Hits Tour may refer to:

- Greatest Hits Tour (Avril Lavigne), a 2024 concert tour by Avril Lavigne
- Greatest Hits tour (Björk), a 2003 concert tour by Björk
- Greatest Hits Tour (Boston), a 1997 concert tour by Boston
- Greatest Hits Tour (Donna Summer), a 2005 concert tour by Donna Summer
- Greatest Hits Tour (Elton John), a 2011 concert tour by Elton John
- Greatest Hits Tour (Five), a 2013 concert tour by Five
- The Greatest Hits Tour (Girls Aloud), a 2007 concert tour by Girls Aloud
- Greatest Hits Tour (Olivia Newton-John), a 1999 concert tour by Olivia Newton-John
- The Greatest Hits Tour (Sugababes), a 2007 concert tour by the Sugababes
- The Greatest Hits Tour (Take That), a 2006 reunion tour by Take That
- Greatest Hits Tour (Westlife), a 2012 concert tour by Westlife
- Greatest Hits Live Tour, a 2005 live album by Level 42
- More Today Than Yesterday: The Greatest Hits Tour, a 2010 concert tour by Diana Ross
- Showgirl: The Greatest Hits Tour, a 2005 concert tour by Kylie Minogue

== See also ==
- Greatest Hits (disambiguation)
- List of greatest hits albums
- Greatest Hits Live (disambiguation)#Tours
