= The Best of The Christians =

Greatest hits album by The Christians
- Released: 1993
- Label: Island
- Producer: Laurie Latham; The Christians; Martin & Steven Young; Martyn Phillips; Mark "Spike" Stent

The Christians chronology
Happy in Hell (1992)	The Best of The Christians (1993)	Prodigal Sons (2003)

The Best of The Christians is a greatest hits album by English music ensemble The Christians, released in 1993 by Island Records. It includes most of the band's singles from their first three studio albums—The Christians (1987), Colour (1990) and Happy in Hell (1992)—plus the single "Harvest for the World", which had been included on the compilation album 1988 Summer Olympics Album: One Moment in Time (1988), new song "The Perfect Moment", and a cover of Bob Marley's "Small Axe" which was the B-side to "Harvest for the World".

== Track listing ==
No.	Title	Writer(s)	Origin	Length
1.	"Forgotten Town"	Henry Priestman	The Christians (1987)	5:11
2.	"Harvest for the World"	The Isley Brothers	1988 Summer Olympics Album: One Moment in Time (1988)	3:59
3.	"The Perfect Moment"	Priestman; Mark Herman	previously unreleased (1993)	4:49
4.	"What's in a Word"	Priestman	Happy in Hell (1992)	5:44
5.	"Born Again"	Priestman	The Christians	5:21
6.	"Words"	music: Seán Ó Riada; lyrics: Priestman	Colour (1990)	7:13
7.	"Ideal World"	Herman	The Christians	4:20
8.	"The Bottle"	Gil Scott-Heron	Happy in Hell	4:37
9.	"When the Fingers Point"	Priestman	The Christians	3:32
10.	"Father"	Garry Christian	Happy in Hell	5:28
11.	"Greenback Drive" (Remix)	Priestman	Colour	4:26
12.	"Hooverville (And They Promised Us the World)"	Priestman; Herman	The Christians	4:46
13.	"Small Axe"	Bob Marley	B-side to the "Harvest for the World" single (1988)	5:14

== Personnel ==
Adapted from the album's liner notes.

- Laurie Latham – producer (tracks 1, 3, 5–7, 9–12)
- Martin & Steven Young – producer (track 2)
- The Christians – producer (tracks 3, 4, 8, 10, 13)
- Martyn Phillips – producer (track 4)
- Mark "Spike" Stent – additional production & mix (track 4), producer (track 8)
- Henry Priestman – arrangement (track 6)

== Charts ==
Chart performance for The Best of The Christians
Chart (1993)	Peak position
UK Albums (OCC)	22

== Certifications ==
Region	Certification	Certified units/sales
United Kingdom (BPI)	Gold	100,000^{^}
^{^} Shipments figures based on certification alone.
