= List of greatest hits albums =

A greatest hits album is a compilation album of successful, previously released songs by a particular music artist or band.

Albums entitled Greatest Hits, or similar titles, listed alphabetically by band name or artist's last name, include:

== 0–9 ==
- Greatest Hits by 2Pac (1998)
- Greatest Hits '93–'03 by 311 (2004)
- Best of 50 Cent by 50 Cent (2017)
- Greatest Hits by the 5th Dimension (1970)

== A ==
- Greatest Hits by A*Teens (2005)
- Greatest Hits by ABBA (1975)
- Greatest Hits Vol. 2 by ABBA (1979)
- Gold: Greatest Hits by ABBA (1992)
- More ABBA Gold: More ABBA Hits by ABBA (1993)
- Greatest Hits by Paula Abdul (2000)
- Greatest Hits: Straight Up! by Paula Abdul (2007)
- Greatest Hits by Anna Abreu (2012)
- Greatest Hits by Ace of Base (2000)
- Greatest Hits by Aerosmith (1980)
- Greatest Hits by Aerosmith (2023)
- O, Yeah! Ultimate Aerosmith Hits by Aerosmith (2002)
- Devil's Got a New Disguise – The Very Best of Aerosmith by Aerosmith (2006)
- Keeps Gettin' Better: A Decade of Hits by Christina Aguilera (2008)
- Greatest Hits by Air Supply (1983)
- Greatest Hits by Alabama (1986)
- Greatest Hits Vol. II by Alabama (1991)
- Greatest Hits Vol. III by Alabama (1994)
- Nothing Safe: Best of the Box by Alice in Chains (1999)
- Greatest Hits by Alice in Chains (2001)
- Icon by Gary Allan (2012)
- All Hits by All Saints (2001)
- Story (2000) by Amorphis
- Chapters (2003) by Amorphis
- 181920 by Namie Amuro (1998)
- Love Enhanced Single Collection by Namie Amuro (2002)
- Best Fiction by Namie Amuro (2008)
- Finally by Namie Amuro (2017)
- Pieces of a Dream by Anastacia (2005)
- Ultimate Collection by Anastacia (2015)
- Greatest Hits by John Anderson (1984)
- Greatest Hits Vol. 2 by John Anderson (1990)
- Greatest Hits by John Anderson (1996)
- The Best of Apocalyptica by Apocalyptica (2002)
- Greatest Hits by April Wine (1979)
- Greatest Hits Live 1997 by April Wine (1997)
- Greatest Hits Live 2003 by April Wine (2003)
- Greatest Hits by Aqua (2009)
- Track Record by Joan Armatrading (1983)
- Les Greatest Hits by Army of Lovers (1995)
- Greatest Hits? by As Friends Rust (2014)
- Intergalactic Sonic 7″s by Ash (2002)
- The Best of Ash by Ash (2011)
- Teenage Wildlife: 25 Years of Ash by Ash (2020)
- Greatest Hits! by the Association (1968)
- Greatest Hits by Rick Astley (2002)
- Greatest Hits by Rodney Atkins (2015)
- Greatest Hits by Atomic Kitten (2004)
- The Collection by Atomic Kitten (2005)
- The Best of 2005–2013 by Avenged Sevenfold (2016)
- The Best of Aztec Camera by Aztec Camera (1999)

== B ==
- The Best of Andrea Bocelli: Vivere by the Andrea Bocelli (2007)
- The Hits: Chapter One by the Backstreet Boys (2001)
- Playlist: The Very Best of Backstreet Boys by the Backstreet Boys (2010)
- The Essential Backstreet Boys by the Backstreet Boys (2013)
- Hits: Greatest and Others by Joan Baez (1973)
- Greatest Hits by the Bangles (1990)
- Disc One: All Their Greatest Hits (1991–2001) by Barenaked Ladies (2001)
- Endless Summer by the Beach Boys
- The Greatest Hits – Volume 1: 20 Good Vibrations by the Beach Boys (1999)
- The Greatest Hits – Volume 2: 20 More Good Vibrations by the Beach Boys (1999)
- Sounds of Summer: The Very Best of the Beach Boys by the Beach Boys (2003)
- Solid Gold Hits by Beastie Boys (2005)
- 1962–1966 (The Red Album) by the Beatles (1973)
- 1967–1970 (The Blue Album) by the Beatles (1973)
- 20 Greatest Hits by the Beatles (1982)
- 1 by the Beatles (2000)
- Best of Bee Gees by the Bee Gees (1969)
- Best of Bee Gees, Volume 2 by the Bee Gees (1973)
- Bee Gees Gold by the Bee Gees (1976)
- Greatest by the Bee Gees (1979)
- The Very Best of the Bee Gees by the Bee Gees (1990)
- Their Greatest Hits: The Record by the Bee Gees (2001)
- The Ultimate Bee Gees by the Bee Gees (2009)
- Timeless: The All-Time Greatest Hits by the Bee Gees (2017)
- Greatest Hits by Pat Benatar (2005)
- Greatest Hits by Better Than Ezra (2005)
- Greatest Hits by Big & Rich (2009)
- The Best of Big Bang 2006–2014 by Big Bang (2014)
- My Worlds: The Collection by Justin Bieber (2010)
- Greatest Hits by Björk (2002)
- The Best of Cilla Black by Cilla Black (1968)
- The Best of Black Sabbath by Black Sabbath (2000)
- Symptom of the Universe: The Original Black Sabbath 1970–1978 by Black Sabbath (2002)
- Greatest Hits 1970–1978 by Black Sabbath (2006)
- Greatest Hits by Black Sabbath (2009)
- Iron Man: The Best of Black Sabbath by Black Sabbath (2012)
- The Ultimate Collection by Black Sabbath (2016)
- Greatest Hits by Blink-182 (2005)
- Icon by Blink-182 (2013)
- The Best of Blondie by Blondie (1981)
- Greatest Hits by Blondie (2002)
- Greatest Hits by Blood, Sweat & Tears (1972)
- Choices – The Singles Collection by The Blow Monkeys (1989)
- Don't Fear the Reaper: The Best of Blue Öyster Cult by Blue Öyster Cult (2000)
- Blur: The Best of by Blur (2000)
- Greatest Hits by Bone Thugs-n-Harmony (2004)
- The Greatest Hits by Boney M. (1993)
- The Greatest Hits by Boney M. (2001)
- 25 Jaar Na Daddy Cool by Boney M. (2001)
- Greatest Hits by Bon Jovi (2010)
- Greatest Hits by Boston (1997)
- Changesonebowie by David Bowie (1976)
- Changestwobowie by David Bowie (1981)
- Legacy (The Very Best of David Bowie) by David Bowie (2016)
- Legacy: The Greatest Hits Collection by Boyz II Men (2001)
- Shallow Bay: The Best of Breaking Benjamin by Breaking Benjamin (2011)
- The Greatest Hits Collection by Brooks & Dunn (1997)
- The Greatest Hits Collection II by Brooks & Dunn (2004)
- Greatest Hits by Chuck Brown (1998)
- Best of Chuck Brown by Chuck Brown (2005)
- Greatest Hits by Bucks Fizz (1983)
- Retrospective: The Best of Buffalo Springfield by Buffalo Springfield (1969)
- Greatest Hits by Tracy Byrd (2005)
- The Byrds' Greatest Hits by the Byrds (1967)
- The Best of The Byrds: Greatest Hits, Volume II by the Byrds (1972)
- B'z The Best "Pleasure" by B'z (1998)
- B'z The Best "Treasure" by B'z (1998)
- B'z The Best "Pleasure II" by B'z (2005)
- B'z The Best "Ultra Pleasure" by B'z (2008)
- B'z The Best "Ultra Treasure" by B'z (2008)
- B'z The Best XXV 1988–1998 by B'z (2013)
- B'z The Best XXV 1999–2012 by B'z (2013)

== C ==
- The Best of C-Murder by C-Murder (2005)
- The Best of Tevin Campbell by Tevin Campbell (2001)
- #1's by Mariah Carey (1998)
- Greatest Hits by Mariah Carey (2001)
- The Essential Mariah Carey by Mariah Carey (2011)
- Number 1 to Infinity by Mariah Carey (2015)
- Most Requested Hits by Aaron Carter (2003)
- Come Get It: The Very Best of Aaron Carter by Aaron Carter (2006)
- 2 Good 2 B True by Aaron Carter (2006)
- The Best of Candlebox by Candlebox (2006)
- Greatest Hits, Vol. 1 by Johnny Cash (1967)
- Greatest Hits, Vol. 2 by Johnny Cash (1971)
- Greatest Hits, Vol. 3 by Johnny Cash (1978)
- Greatest Hits by Cher (1974)
- Greatest Hits: 1965–1992 by Cher (1992)
- The Greatest Hits by Cher (1999)
- If I Could Turn Back Time: Cher's Greatest Hits by Cher (1999)
- The Very Best of Cher by Cher (2003)
- Gold by Cher (2005)
- Greatest Hits by Kenny Chesney (2000)
- Chicago IX by Chicago (1975)
- Greatest Hits, Volume II by Chicago (1981)
- Greatest Hits 1982–1989 by Chicago (1989)
- Greatest Hits by Chilliwack (1983)
- Greatest Hits by the Chipmunks (1992)
- The Best of The Christians by The Christians (1993)
- Greatest Hits 1994–2004 by Terri Clark (2004)
- Greatest Hits – Chapter One by Kelly Clarkson (2012)
- Icon by Joe Cocker (2011)
- Seven Year Itch by Collective Soul
- Colors of the Day by Judy Collins (1972)
- ...Hits by Phil Collins (1998)
- The Singles by Phil Collins (2016)
- Greatest Hits by Patricia Conroy (2000)
- Greatest Hits by Alice Cooper (1974)
- Greatest Hits Volume One by Billy "Crash" Craddock (1974)
- Greatest Hits by Billy "Crash" Craddock (1983)
- Lovecraft & Witch Hearts (Disc 1) by Cradle of Filth (2002)
- The Very Best of Randy Crawford by Randy Crawford (1993)
- The Very Best of Cream by Cream (1995)
- Greatest Hits by Creed (2004)
- Chronicle: The 20 Greatest Hits by Creedence Clearwater Revival (1976)
- Photographs & Memories by Jim Croce (1974)
- Greatest Hits by Crosby, Stills & Nash (2005)
- Greatest Hits by Chris Cummings (2004)
- The Best of Crush 40 – Super Sonic Songs by Crush 40 (2009)
- Driving Through Forever –The Ultimate Crush 40 Collection– by Crush 40 (2019)
- Greatest Hits by the Cure (2001)
- Icon by Billy Currington (2011)
- Icon by Billy Ray Cyrus (2011)

== D ==
- Greatest Hits by Terence Trent D'Arby (2002)
- It's Not Over...The Hits So Far by Daughtry (2016)
- 5 Years of mau5 by deadmau5 (2014)
- That's the Way I Like It: The Best of Dead or Alive by Dead or Alive (2010)
- Deepest Purple: The Very Best of Deep Purple by Deep Purple (1980)
- Vault: Def Leppard Greatest Hits (1980–1995) by Def Leppard (1995)
- Best of Def Leppard by Def Leppard (2004)
- The Best of Deicide by Deicide (2003)
- John Denver's Greatest Hits by John Denver (1973)
- John Denver's Greatest Hits, Volume 2 by John Denver (1977)
- John Denver's Greatest Hits, Volume 3 by John Denver (1984)
- The Singles 81→85 by Depeche Mode (1985)
- The Singles 86>98 by Depeche Mode (1998)
- Greatest Hits by Depeche Mode (1987)
- The Best of Depeche Mode Volume 1 by Depeche Mode (2006)
- #1's by Destiny's Child (2005)
- Devo's Greatest Hits by Devo (1990)
- Devo's Greatest Misses by Devo (1990)
- The Very Best of Dexys Midnight Runners by Dexys Midnight Runners (1991)
- Greatest Hits by Dido (2013)
- The Very Beast of Dio by Dio (2000)
- All the Way... A Decade of Song by Celine Dion (1999)
- My Love: Essential Collection by Celine Dion (2008)
- Money for Nothing by Dire Straits (1988)
- Sultans of Swing: The Very Best of Dire Straits by Dire Straits (1998)
- Private Investigations by Dire Straits and Mark Knopfler (2005)
- Greatest Hits by Jason Donovan (1991)
- Greatest Hits by Jason Donovan (2006)
- 13 by the Doors (1970)
- The Best of the Doors by the Doors (1973)
- Greatest Hits by the Doors (1980)
- The Best of the Doors by the Doors (1985)
- The Doors Classics by the Doors (1985)
- The Very Best of the Doors by the Doors (2001)
- Legacy: The Absolute Best by the Doors (2003)
- The Very Best of the Doors by the Doors (2007)
- The Future Starts Here: The Essential Doors Hits by the Doors (2008)
- The Platinum Collection by the Doors (2008)
- Chronicles: Death Row Classics by Dr. Dre (2006)
- Greatest Hits by Dr. Hook & the Medicine Show (1980)
- Greatest Hit (...and 21 Other Pretty Cool Songs) by Dream Theater (2008)
- The Drifters Golden Hits by the Drifters (1968)
- Best of Hilary Duff by Hilary Duff (2009)
- Decade by Duran Duran (1989)
- Greatest by Duran Duran (1998)
- The Essential Collection by Duran Duran (2000)
- Bob Dylan's Greatest Hits by Bob Dylan (1967)
- Bob Dylan's Greatest Hits Vol. II by Bob Dylan (1971)
- Bob Dylan's Greatest Hits Volume 3 by Bob Dylan (1994)
- The Essential Bob Dylan by Bob Dylan (2000)

== E ==
- Their Greatest Hits (1971–1975) by the Eagles (1976)
- Eagles Greatest Hits, Vol. 2 by the Eagles (1982)
- Greatest Hits Live by Earth, Wind & Fire (1996)
- Greatest Hits by Earth, Wind & Fire (1998)
- Eternal E by Eazy-E (1995)
- Evolution (1999) and When All Is Said (2006) by Edge of Sanity
- Olé ELO, the first compilation album by the Electric Light Orchestra (1976)
- ELO's Greatest Hits by Electric Light Orchestra (1979)
- Curtain Call: The Hits by Eminem (2005)
- Curtain Call 2 by Eminem (2022)
- Greatest Hits by Gloria Estefan (1992)
- Greatest Hits Vol. II by Gloria Estefan (2001)
- The Essential Gloria Estefan by Gloria Estefan (2006)
- Greatest Hits by Eternal (1997)
- Greatest Hits by Eurythmics (1991)
- Ultimate Collection by Eurythmics (2005)
- Greatest Hits by Sara Evans (2007)
- Ten Years Gone: The Best of Everclear 1994–2004 by Everclear (2004)
- 24 Original Classics by the Everly Brothers (1984)
- Greatest Hits by Exposé (1995)
- Best of En Vogue by En Vogue (1998)
- The Very Best of En Vogue by En Vogue (2001)

== F ==
- This Is It: The Best of Faith No More by Faith No More (2003)
- Believers Never Die: Greatest Hits by Fall Out Boy (2009)
- Greatest Hits: Believers Never Die – Volume Two by Fall Out Boy (2019)
- Greatest Hits by Faster Pussycat (2003)
- The Best of Fear Factory by Fear Factory (2006)
- Greatest Hits by Five (2001)
- Greatest Hits by Five Star (1989)
- The Greatest Hits by Five Star (2003)
- Greatest Hits by Fleetwood Mac (1971)
- Greatest Hits by Fleetwood Mac (1988)
- Greatest Hits by Foo Fighters (2009)
- Greatest Hits by Samantha Fox (1992)
- Greatest Hits by Samantha Fox (2009)
- Connie's Greatest Hits by Connie Francis (1959)
- More Greatest Hits by Connie Francis (1961)
- Aretha's Best by Aretha Franklin (2001)
- Greatest Hits by Janie Fricke (1982)
- Hits To The Head by Franz Ferdinand (2022)

== G ==
- Shaking the Tree: Sixteen Golden Greats by Peter Gabriel (1990)
- Hit by Peter Gabriel (2003)
- Absolute Garbage by Garbage (2007)
- Greatest Hits by Marvin Gaye (1964)
- Marvin Gaye's Greatest Hits by Marvin Gaye (1976)
- Turn It On Again: The Hits by Genesis (1999)
- R-Kive by Genesis (2014)
- The Last Domino? – The Hits by Genesis (2021)
- Greatest Hits by Debbie Gibson (1995)
- Greatest Hits...So Far by Brantley Gilbert (2025)
- Icon by Vince Gill (2010)
- The Sound of Girls Aloud: The Greatest Hits by Girls Aloud (2006)
- Ten by Girls Aloud (2012)
- The Best by Girls' Generation (2014)
- Review by Glay (1997)
- Drive: Glay Complete Best by Glay (2000)
- Ballad Best Singles: White Road by Glay (2005)
- The Great Vacation Vol. 1: Super Best of Glay by Glay (2009)
- The Great Vacation Vol. 2: Super Best of Glay by Glay (2009)
- Aces and Kings – The Best of Go West by Go West (1993)
- Greatest Hits by Goldie Lookin Chain (2004)
- For You by Selena Gomez (2014)
- In a Coma: 1995–2005 by Matthew Good (2005)
- Greatest Hits by Good Charlotte (2010)
- The Singles Collection 2001–2011 by Gorillaz (2011)
- Greatest Hits by Grand Funk Railroad (2006)
- The Best by Ariana Grande (2017)
- Greatest Hits 1986–2004 by Amy Grant (2004)
- Skeletons from the Closet: The Best of Grateful Dead by the Grateful Dead (1974)
- What a Long Strange Trip It's Been by the Grateful Dead (1977)
- The Very Best of Grateful Dead by the Grateful Dead (2003)
- The Best of the Grateful Dead by the Grateful Dead (2015)
- Greatest Hits by David Gray (2007)
- Al Green's Greatest Hits by Al Green (1975)
- Greatest Hits: God's Favorite Band by Green Day (2017)
- International Superhits! by Green Day (2001)
- The Guess Who – Greatest Hits by the Guess Who (1999)
- Greatest Hits by Guns N' Roses (2004)
- The Best of Arlo Guthrie by Arlo Guthrie (1977)

== H ==
- Greatest Hits by Half Japanese (1995)
- Looking Back – The Best of Daryl Hall + John Oates by Hall & Oates (1991)
- A Ballads by Ayumi Hamasaki (2003)
- A Ballads 2 by Ayumi Hamasaki (2021)
- A Best by Ayumi Hamasaki (2001)
- A Best 2: Black by Ayumi Hamasaki (2007)
- A Best 2: White by Ayumi Hamasaki (2007)
- A Complete: All Singles by Ayumi Hamasaki (2008)
- A Summer Best by Ayumi Hamasaki (2012)
- Hard-Fi: Best of 2004–2014 by Hard-Fi (2014)
- Greatest Hits by Steve Harley & Cockney Rebel (1988)
- The Very Best of Emmylou Harris: Heartaches & Highways by Emmylou Harris (2005)
- Midwesterners: The Hits by Hawthorne Heights (2010)
- The Essential Heart by Heart (2002)
- Greatest Hits/Live by Heart (1980)
- Greatest Hits by Heart (1998)
- Greatest Hits: 1985–1995 by Heart (2000)
- These Dreams: Greatest Hits by Heart (1997)
- Higher and Higher: The Best of Heaven 17 by Heaven 17 (1993, 1999)
- The Best of Hed Planet Earth by Hed PE
- Major Pain 2 Indee Freedom: The Best of Hed P.E. by Hed PE
- Smash Hits by The Jimi Hendrix Experience (1968)
- And Love Said No: The Greatest Hits 1997–2004 by HIM (2004)
- XX – Two Decades of Love Metal by HIM (2012)
- Greatest Hits (Marcia Hines album) by Marcia Hines (1981)
- Greatest Hits Volume 2 by Marcia Hines (1982)
- Diva (Marcia Hines album) by Marcia Hines (2001)
- Marcia: Greatest Hits 1975–1983 by Marcia Hines (2004)
- The Best of Hootie & the Blowfish: 1993–2003 by Hootie & the Blowfish (2004)
- Whitney: The Greatest Hits by Whitney Houston (2000)
- I Will Always Love You: The Best of Whitney Houston (2012)
- Labours of Love – The Best of Hue and Cry by Hue and Cry (1993)
- Greatest Hits by the Human League (1988, 1996)
- Classics by Hybrid (2012)

== I ==
- Greatest Hits by Ice Cube (2001)
- Greatest Hits by Billy Idol (2001)
- The Very Best of Billy Idol: Idolize Yourself by Billy Idol (2008)
- Greatest Hits by Enrique Iglesias (2008)
- The Greatest Hits by Il Divo (2012)
- The Best of Ill Niño by Ill Niño (2006)
- Greatest Hits by Immature/IMx (2001)
- Monuments and Melodies by Incubus (2009)
- Greatest Hits by In Flames (2012)
- Greatest Hits by Inspiral Carpets (2003)
- Greatest Hits by INXS (1994)
- The Best of INXS by INXS (2002)
- The Years 1979–1997 by INXS (2002)
- The Very Best by INXS (2011)
- Best of the Beast by Iron Maiden (1996)
- Greatest Hits by Burl Ives

== J ==
- The Greatest Hits Collection by Alan Jackson (1995)
- Greatest Hits Volume II by Alan Jackson (2003)
- Design of a Decade: 1986–1996 by Janet Jackson (1995)
- Number Ones by Janet Jackson (2009)
- Icon: Number Ones by Janet Jackson (2010)
- The Best of Michael Jackson by Michael Jackson (1975)
- 18 Greatest Hits by Michael Jackson (1983)
- 14 Greatest Hits by Michael Jackson (1984)
- Greatest Hits: HIStory, Volume I by Michael Jackson (1995)
- 20th Century Masters – The Millennium Collection: The Best of Michael Jackson by Michael Jackson (2000)
- Number Ones by Michael Jackson (2003)
- The Essential Michael Jackson by Michael Jackson (2005)
- Icon by Michael Jackson (2012)
- The Best of Michael Jackson & The Jackson 5ive by Michael Jackson and the Jackson 5 (1997)
- The Very Best of Michael Jackson with The Jackson Five by Michael Jackson and the Jackson 5 (1999)
- Greatest Hits by the Jackson 5 (1971)
- Greatest Hits by the Jam (1991)
- Icon by Ja Rule (2012)
- The Hits Collection, Volume One by Jay-Z (2010)
- Greatest Hits by Wyclef Jean (2003)
- The Worst of Jefferson Airplane by Jefferson Airplane (1970)
- Greatest Hits by the Jets (2004)
- Goodbye – The Greatest Hits by JLS (2013)
- The Essential Billy Joel by Billy Joel (2001)
- Greatest Hits – Volume I & Volume II by Billy Joel (1985)
- Greatest Hits Volume III by Billy Joel (1997)
- Greatest Hits by Joe (2008)
- Elton John's Greatest Hits by Elton John (1974)
- Elton John's Greatest Hits Volume II by Elton John (1977)
- Elton John's Greatest Hits Vol. 3 by Elton John (1987)
- Elton John Greatest Hits by Elton John (1994)
- Island Life by Grace Jones (1985)
- Greatest Hits by Tom Jones (1973)
- Janis Joplin's Greatest Hits by Janis Joplin (1973)
- Greatest Hits by Journey (1988)
- Greatest Hits 2 by Journey (2011)
- Greatest Hits by the Judds (1988)
- The Greatest Hits by Juvenile (2004)

== K ==
- The Diamond Collection by Jelena Karleuša (2009)
- Brave Yester Days (2004) by Katatonia
- The Black Sessions (2005) by Katatonia
- The Best of Keane by Keane (2013)
- Greatest Hits Volume One by Toby Keith (1998)
- Greatest Hits 2 by Toby Keith (2004)
- Greatest Hits by Kenny G (1997)
- The Boy Who Flew to the Moon, Vol. 1 by Kid Cudi (2022)
- Kidz Bop Greatest Hits by Kidz Bop (2009)
- Direct Hits by the Killers (2013)
- Rebel Diamonds by the Killers (2023)
- The Best of King Diamond by King Diamond (2003)
- Greatest Hits! by the Kinks (1966)
- The Kink Kronikles by the Kinks (1972)
- Greatest Kiss by Kiss (1997)
- The Very Best of Kiss by Kiss (2002)
- 20th Century Masters – The Millennium Collection: The Best of Kiss by Kiss (2003)
- Greatest Hits Vol. 1 by Korn (2004)
- Greatest Hits by Lenny Kravitz (2000)

== L ==
- Best Of by LaFee (2009)
- Twelve Deadly Cyns...and Then Some by Cyndi Lauper (1994)
- Greatest Hits by Avril Lavigne (2024)
- The Best of Led Zeppelin by Led Zeppelin (1999, 2000, 2002)
- Mothership by Led Zeppelin (2007)
- The Best of The Lemonheads: The Atlantic Years by the Lemonheads (1998)
- Lennon Legend: The Very Best of John Lennon by John Lennon (1997)
- Instant Karma: All-Time Greatest Hits by John Lennon (2002)
- Working Class Hero: The Definitive Lennon by John Lennon (2005)
- The Annie Lennox Collection by Annie Lennox (2009)
- Greatest Hits Live Tour by Level 42 (2005)
- Greatest Hits & Videos by Huey Lewis and the News (2006)
- The Very Best of Gordon Lightfoot by Gordon Lightfoot (1974)
- I Am Music by Lil Wayne (2023)
- Greatest Hitz by Limp Bizkit (2005)
- Icon by Limp Bizkit (2011)
- Between Us by Little Mix (2021)
- Best Of Kimberley Locke by Kimberley Locke (2023)
- The Essential Kenny Loggins by Kenny Loggins (2002)
- Dance Again... the Hits by Jennifer Lopez (2012)
- The Greatest Hits by Lulu (2003)
- Greatest Hits by Luv' (1979)
- Greatest Hits by Luv' (1990)
- Greatest Hits by Lynyrd Skynyrd (2005)
- Icon by Lynyrd Skynyrd (2010)
- Papercuts (Singles Collection 2000–2023) by Linkin Park (2024)

== M ==
- The Immaculate Collection by Madonna (1990)
- GHV2 by Madonna (2001)
- Celebration by Madonna (2009)
- Greatest Hits by Charlie Major (2007)
- 16 of Their Greatest Hits by the Mamas & the Papas (1969)
- Greatest Hits by Barry Manilow (1978)
- Greatest Hits: The Platinum Collection by Barry Manilow (1993)
- Lest We Forget: The Best Of by Marilyn Manson (2004)
- Legend by Bob Marley (1984)
- Greatest Hits by Richard Marx (1993)
- Greatest Hits by Richard Marx (1997)
- Johnny's Greatest Hits by Johnny Mathis (1958)
- Greatest Hits by Math the Band (2006)
- Greatest Hits by MC Hammer (1996)
- Greatest Hits by MC Lars (2012)
- Greatest Hits by Martina McBride (2001)
- All the Best! by Paul McCartney (1987)
- Greatest Hits 1995–2005 by Jason McCoy (2005)
- Greatest Hits by Neal McCoy (1997)
- All the Greatest Hits by McFly (2007)
- Greatest Hits by Tim McGraw (1996)
- Greatest Hits – Live by Don McLean (1997)
- Greatest Hits: Back to the Start by Megadeth (2005)
- Warheads on Foreheads by Megadeth (2019)
- The Best That I Could Do 1978–1988 by John Mellencamp (1997)
- Greatest Hits by Jo Dee Messina (2003)
- Songbook Vol. 1 by Mika (2013)
- Greatest Hits by Ronnie Milsap (1980)
- Greatest Fits by Ministry (2001)
- Greatest Hits by Kylie Minogue (1992)
- Greatest Hits by Kylie Minogue (2002)
- Greatest Hits: 87–99 by Kylie Minogue (2003)
- Ultimate Kylie by Kylie Minogue (2004)
- Kylie Hits by Kylie Minogue (2011)
- The Best of Kylie Minogue by Kylie Minogue (2012)
- Step Back in Time: The Definitive Collection by Kylie Minogue (2019)
- Greatest Hits by Kim Mitchell (1994)
- Machine Punch Through: The Singles Collection by Moist (2001)
- The Monkees Greatest Hits by the Monkees (1976)
- More Greatest Hits of the Monkees by the Monkees (1982)
- Greatest Hits by Monster Magnet (2003)
- Greatest Hits by John Michael Montgomery (1997)
- Greatest Hits by the Moody Blues (1989)
- The Best of Mandy Moore by Mandy Moore (2004)
- Greatest Hits by Craig Morgan (2008)
- The Collection by Alanis Morissette (2005)
- Greatest Hits by Morrissey (2008)
- Greatest Hits by Mötley Crüe (1998)
- Greatest Hits by Mötley Crüe (2009)
- Greatest Hits by Mott the Hoople (1976)
- The Essential Alison Moyet by Alison Moyet (2001)
- May Death Never Stop You by My Chemical Romance (2014)

== N ==
- Greatest Hits by NSYNC (2005)
- The Collection by NSYNC (2010)
- The Essential *NSYNC by NSYNC (2014)
- Greatest Hits by Nas (2007)
- Harvest of Hits by Nat King Cole (1950)
- Greatest Hits by Nazareth (1975)
- Greatest Hits by N-Dubz (2011)
- Hits by New Found Glory (2008)
- Greatest Hits by New Kids on the Block (1999, 2008)
- The Best of New Order by New Order (1994)
- International by New Order (2002)
- Singles by New Order (2005, 2016)
- Substance 1987 by New Order (1987)
- The Greatest Hits by Newsboys (2007)
- The Best of Nickelback Volume 1 by Nickelback (2013)
- Queen Radio: Volume 1 by Nicki Minaj (2022)
- Nightfall Overture by Nightingale (2004)
- Highest Hopes: The Best of Nightwish by Nightwish (2005)
- Nirvana by Nirvana (2002)
- Icon by Nirvana (2010)
- The Best of No Angels by No Angels (2003)
- The Singles 1992–2003 by No Doubt (2003)
- The Greatest Songs Ever Written (By Us) by NOFX (2004)
- Greatest Hits by the Notorious B.I.G. (2007)
- Greatest Hits by N.W.A (1996)

== O ==
- This Thing Called Love: The Greatest Hits of Alexander O'Neal by Alexander O'Neal (1992)
- Greatest Hits by the Oak Ridge Boys (1980)
- Greatest Hits 2 by the Oak Ridge Boys (1984)
- Greatest Hits 3 by the Oak Ridge Boys (1989)
- Stop the Clocks by Oasis (2006)
- Time Flies... 1994–2009 by Oasis (2010)
- Greatest Hits by the Offspring (2005)
- Icon by Mike Oldfield (2012)
- Greatest Hits by Roy Orbison (2009)
- Greatest Hits of the Outlaws, High Tides Forever by the Outlaws (1982)
- Greatest Hits by Jake Owen (2017)

== P ==
- The Best of Pantera: Far Beyond the Great Southern Cowboys' Vulgar Hits! by Pantera (2003)
- ...To Be Loved: The Best of Papa Roach by Papa Roach (2010)
- Parliament's Greatest Hits by Parliament (1984)
- Greatest Hits by Dolly Parton (1982)
- Greatest Hits by the Partridge Family (1989)
- The Best of Laura Pausini: E ritorno da te by Laura Pausini (2001)
- 20: The Greatest Hits by Laura Pausini (2013)
- Rearviewmirror (Greatest Hits 1991–2003) by Pearl Jam (2004)
- The Best of Peter, Paul and Mary: Ten Years Together by Peter, Paul and Mary (1970)
- Greatest Hits by Tom Petty & the Heartbreakers (1993)
- Greatest Hits... So Far!!! by Pink (2010)
- The Best of Pink Floyd: A Foot in the Door by Pink Floyd (2011)
- The Best of Pink Floyd / Masters of Rock by Pink Floyd (1970)
- Echoes: The Best of Pink Floyd by Pink Floyd (2001)
- Once More with Feeling: Singles 1996–2004 by Placebo (2004)
- Greatest Hits: The Atlantic Years by P.O.D. (2006)
- Poison's Greatest Hits: 1986–1996 by Poison (1996)
- Greatest Hits by the Police (1992)
- ELV1S by Elvis Presley (2002)
- Elvis' Golden Records by Elvis Presley (1958)
- ELVIIS: 2nd to None by Elvis Presley (2003)
- Best of Me by Maxi Priest (1991)
- They Can't All Be Zingers by Primus (2006)
- The Hits/The B-Sides by Prince (1993)
- The Very Best of Prince by Prince (2001)
- Ultimate Prince by Prince (2006)
- Their Law: The Singles 1990–2005 by the Prodigy (2005)
- Greatest Hits by P-Square (2013)

== Q ==
- Greatest Hits by Queen (1981)
- Greatest Hits II by Queen (1991)
- Greatest Hits III by Queen (1999)
- Icon by Queen (2013)
- Greatest Hits in Japan by Queen (2020)
- Flashback by Ivy Queen (2005)
- The Best of Ivy Queen by Ivy Queen (2006)
- Greatest Hits by Ivy Queen (2007)
- Greatest Hits by Queensrÿche (2000)
- Greatest Hits by Quiet Riot (1996)

== R ==
- Radiohead: The Best Of by Radiohead (2008)
- Made in Germany 1995–2011 by Rammstein (2011)
- Greatest Hits by the Ramones (2006)
- Greatest Hits, Vol. 1 by Rare Essence (1995)
- Greatest Hits Volume 1 by Rascal Flatts (2008)
- Twenty Years of Rascal Flatts: The Greatest Hits by Rascal Flatts (2020)
- What Hits!? by Red Hot Chili Peppers (1992)
- Greatest Hits by Red Hot Chili Peppers (2003)
- Greatest Hit...and More by Reel Big Fish (2006)
- Greatest Hits by Restless Heart (1998)
- Greatest Hits by Paul Revere & The Raiders (1967)
- 20 Number Ones by Thomas Rhett (2023)
- The Hit List by Cliff Richard (1994)
- The Whole Story: His Greatest Hits by Cliff Richard (2000)
- 75 at 75 by Cliff Richard (2015)
- The Anthology 1962–1974 by the Righteous Brothers (1989)
- Greatest Hits by LeAnn Rimes (2003)
- Greatest Hits by Kenny Rogers (1980)
- Greatest Hits by Kenny Rogers (1988)
- Big Hits (High Tide and Green Grass) by the Rolling Stones (1966)
- Forty Licks by the Rolling Stones (2002)
- GRRR! by the Rolling Stones (2012)
- Hot Rocks 1964–1971 by the Rolling Stones (1971)
- Rolled Gold: The Very Best of the Rolling Stones by the Rolling Stones (1975)
- Through the Past, Darkly (Big Hits Vol. 2) by the Rolling Stones (1969)
- Greatest Hits by Linda Ronstadt (1976)
- Greatest Hits, Volume 2 by Linda Ronstadt (1980)
- A Retrospective by Linda Ronstadt (1977)
- Love & Life: The Very Best of Diana Ross by Diana Ross (2001)
- Greatest Hits by Demis Roussos (1974)
- Golden Hits by Demis Roussos (1975)
- Life & Love by Demis Roussos (1978)
- Insel der Zärtlichkeit by Demi Roussos (1980)
- The Phenomenon 1968–1998 (a.k.a. Forever and Ever – 40 Greatest Hits) by Demis Roussos (1998)
- Forever and Ever – Definitive Collection by Demis Roussos (2002)
- Collected by Demis Roussos (2015)
- The Best of Roxy Music by Roxy Music (2001)
- Greatest Hits by Roxy Music (1977)
- Greatest Hits by Run-D.M.C. (2002)
- The Spirit of Radio: Greatest Hits 1974–1987 by Rush (2003)

== S ==
- The Best of Sade by Sade (1994)
- The Ultimate Collection by Sade (2011)
- Greatest Hits by Safri Duo (2010)
- Moving Forward in Reverse: Greatest Hits by Saliva (2010)
- Santana's Greatest Hits by Santana (1974)
- Greatest Hits by the Saturdays (2014)
- Still the Orchestra Plays by Savatage (2010)
- Tales from the Script: Greatest Hits by the Script (2021)
- Seether: 2002–2013 by Seether (2013)
- Greatest Hits by Bob Seger (1994)
- Greatest Hits by Selena (2003)
- The Best of Sepultura by Sepultura (2006)
- 17 Is Right Here by Seventeen (2024)
- Seeking the Way: The Greatest Hits by Shadows Fall (2007)
- Greatest Hits by the Shadows (1963)
- Grandes Éxitos by Shakira (2002)
- Best Of... by Sia (2012)
- Simon and Garfunkel's Greatest Hits by Simon and Garfunkel (1972)
- Greatest Hits by Simply Red (1996)
- The Very Best of Sister Sledge 1973–93 by Sister Sledge (1993)
- 40 Seasons: The Best of Skid Row by Skid Row (1998)
- Antennas to Hell by Slipknot (2012)
- Greatest Hits by Sly & the Family Stone (1970)
- All Star Smash Hits by Smash Mouth (2005)
- Rotten Apples by the Smashing Pumpkins (2001)
- Best...I by the Smiths (1992)
- ...Best II by the Smiths (1992)
- Singles by the Smiths (1995)
- The Very Best of The Smiths by the Smiths (2001)
- Greatest Hits by Will Smith (2002)
- Death Row: Snoop Doggy Dogg at His Best by Snoop Dogg (2001)
- Greatest Hits by Snow Patrol (2013)
- Greatest Hits by Social Distortion (2007)
- The Sledgehammer Files: The Best of Soilwork 1998–2008 by Soilwork (2010)
- The Singles Collection 1984/1990 by Jimmy Somerville, Bronski Beat and The Communards (1990)
- The Very Best Of by Jimmy Somerville, Bronski Beat and The Communards (2001)
- Greatest Hits by Sonia (2007)
- Hits Are for Squares by Sonic Youth (2008)
- Greatest Hits by Sonny & Cher (1974)
- Volume IV The Classic Singles 88–93 by Soul II Soul (1993)
- A-Sides by Soundgarden (1997)
- Telephantasm by Soundgarden (2010)
- The Essential Britney Spears by Britney Spears (2013)
- Greatest Hits: My Prerogative by Britney Spears (2004)
- The Singles Collection by Britney Spears (2009)
- Playlist: The Very Best of Britney Spears by Britney Spears (2012)
- Greatest Hits by the Specials (2006)
- Greatest Hits by Spice Girls (2007)
- Everything Hits at Once: The Best of Spoon by Spoon (2019)
- Dusty – The Silver Collection by Dusty Springfield (1988)
- Greatest Hits by Bruce Springsteen (1995)
- Greatest Hits by Bruce Springsteen and the E Street Band (2009)
- Greatest Hits by Squeeze (1992)
- Good Souls: The Greatest Hits by Starsailor (2015)
- Greatest Hits by Steely Dan (1978)
- Greatest Hits 1974–78 by the Steve Miller Band (1978)
- Greatest Hits by Cat Stevens (1975)
- Greatest Hits by Shakin' Stevens (1984)
- Greatest Hits, Vol. 1 by Rod Stewart (1979)
- Thank You by Stone Temple Pilots (2003)
- Icon by George Strait (2011)
- Icon 2 by George Strait (2011)
- Greatest Hits by Styx (1995)
- Greatest Hits II by Styx (1996)
- Greatest Hits by Sublime (1999)
- 20th Century Masters – The Millennium Collection: The Best of Sublime by Sublime (2002)
- Overloaded: The Singles Collection by Sugababes (2006)
- Playlist: The Very Best of Suicidal Tendencies by Suicidal Tendencies (2010)
- All the Good Shit by Sum 41 (2008)
- On the Radio: Greatest Hits Volumes I & II by Donna Summer (1979)
- Endless Summer: Donna Summer's Greatest Hits by Donna Summer (1994)
- Greatest Hits by Donna Summer (1998)
- The Journey: The Very Best of Donna Summer by Donna Summer (2003)
- Greatest Hits by the Supremes (1967)
- Greatest Hits by Survivor (1989, 1993)
- The Best Yet by Switchfoot (2008)
- Greatest Hits: Ten Years of Turmoil by Swollen Members (2010)

== T ==
- Greatest Hits by Take That (1996)
- Odyssey by Take That (2018)
- Greatest Hits by James Taylor (1976)
- Tears Roll Down (Greatest Hits 82–92) by Tears for Fears (1992)
- Rule the World: The Greatest Hits by Tears for Fears (2017)
- Brotherhood by the Chemical Brothers (2008)
- Greatest Hits by the Temptations (1966)
- Greatest Hits, Vol. 2 by the Temptations (1970)
- The Greatest Hits by Texas (2000)
- Greatest Hits by Thalía (2004)
- Thin Lizzy Greatest Hits by Thin Lizzy (2004)
- A Collection by Third Eye Blind (2006)
- Golden Bisquits by Three Dog Night (1971)
- Greatest Hits by Throbbing Gristle
- Greatest Hits by Tiffany
- tism.bestoff. by TISM (2002)
- The Essential Toto by Toto (2003)
- Greatest Hits by Train (2018)
- The Anthology by A Tribe Called Quest (1999)
- The Best of A Tribe Called Quest by A Tribe Called Quest (2008)
- Greatest Hits by Tanya Tucker (1989)
- The Greatest Hits of Ike & Tina Turner (1965)
- Greatest Hits by Ike & Tina Turner (1976)
- Get Back by Ike & Tina Turner (1985)
- Proud Mary: The Best of Ike & Tina Turner (1991)
- Simply the Best by Tina Turner (1991)
- Icon by Josh Turner (2011)
- Save the Turtles: The Turtles Greatest Hits by the Turtles (2009)
- Greatest Hits by Shania Twain (2004)
- The Best of Type O Negative by Type O Negative (2006)

== U ==
- Utada Hikaru Single Collection Vol. 1 by Hikaru Utada (2004)
- Utada Hikaru Single Collection Vol. 2 by Hikaru Utada (2010)
- Utada the Best by Hikaru Utada (2010)
- Greatest Hits: Decade #1 by Carrie Underwood (2014)

== V ==
- Best Of – Volume I by Van Halen (1996)
- The Best of Both Worlds by Van Halen (2004)
- 20 Greatest Hits by the Ventures (1977)
- The Very Best of the Ventures by the Ventures (1975)
- Peanuts Greatest Hits by Vince Guaraldi (2015)
- The Vogues' Greatest Hits by the Vogues (1970)
- Best of by Roch Voisine (2007)

== W ==
- The Best of Warrant by Warrant (1996)
- Greatest Hits by Jody Watley (1996)
- The Weeknd in Japan by the Weeknd (2018)
- The Highlights by the Weeknd (2021)
- The Collection by Barry White (1988)
- The White Stripes Greatest Hits by the White Stripes (2020)
- Dottie West: Greatest Hits by Dottie West (1992)
- Unbreakable – The Greatest Hits Vol. 1 by Westlife (2002)
- Greatest Hits by Westlife (2011)
- Who's Better, Who's Best by the Who (1988)
- Hot Potatoes: The Best of the Wiggles by the Wiggles (2009)
- Hot Potatoes! The Best of the Wiggles by the Wiggles (2013)
- The Best of the Wiggles by the Wiggles (2016)
- We're All Fruit Salad! The Wiggles' Greatest Hits by the Wiggles (2021)
- Greatest Hits by Kim Wilde (1999)
- Greatest Hits by Hank Williams Jr. (1969)
- Hank Williams, Jr.'s Greatest Hits by Hank Williams Jr. (1982)
- John Williams Greatest Hits 1969–1999 by John Williams (1999)
- Greatest Hits by Robbie Williams (2004)
- In and Out of Consciousness: Greatest Hits 1990–2010 by Robbie Williams (2010)
- Greatest Hits by Gretchen Wilson (2010)
- The Very Best of Winger by Winger (2001)
- 20th Century Masters – The Millennium Collection by Steve Winwood (1999)
- Best of Steve Winwood by Steve Winwood (2002)
- Revolutions – The Very Best of Steve Winwood by Steve Winwood (2010)
- Greatest Hits by Stevie Wonder (1968)
- Greatest Hits Vol. 2 by Stevie Wonder (1971)
- Greatest Hits by Michelle Wright (2000)
- The Essential Wu-Tang Clan by Wu-Tang Clan (2013)

== Y ==
- "Weird Al" Yankovic's Greatest Hits by "Weird Al" Yankovic (1988)
- Greatest Hits Volume II by "Weird Al" Yankovic (1994)
- The Yardbirds Greatest Hits by the Yardbirds (1967)
- Greatest Hits by Yellowcard (2011)
- Greatest Hits Tour Edition by Yellowcard (2011)
- Greatest Hits by Neil Young (2004)
- The Hits by Will Young (2009)
- Greatest Hits by Young Paperboyz (2015)

== Z ==
- Greatest Hits by ZZ Top (1992)

== See also ==
- Greatest Hits (disambiguation)
- Greatest Hits Volume Two and Greatest Hits Volume Three (disambiguations)
- Greatest, Hits and Greatest Hits Live (disambiguations), similar titles that apply to multiple albums
- Lists of albums
- List of Best albums
- Greatest Hits video games, a label applied to high-selling PlayStation, PlayStation 2, PSP and PlayStation 3 video games
- Greatest Hits (comics), a Vertigo comic series, with art by Glenn Fabry
- Welcome to the Videos – An example of a DVD greatest hits; by Guns N' Roses
- Greatest Hits Tour (Westlife), a 2003 tour by Irish pop band Westlife in support of their 2002 Greatest hits album
