= Live & Early Singles =

Compilation album by Trouble Funk
- Released: February 17, 2004
- Genre: Go-go; old-school hip hop
- Length: 1:56:28
- Label: District Line
- Producer: Robert Reed; Tony Fisher

Trouble Funk chronology
E Flat Boogie (2000)	Live & Early Singles (2004)

Professional ratings
Review scores
Source	Rating
AllMusic	4.5/5 stars
ARTISTdirect	4/5 stars
musicHound R&B	(4/5)
The Rolling Stone Album Guide	4/5 stars

Live & Early Singles is a compilation album released on February 17, 2004, by the Washington, D.C.-based go-go band Trouble Funk. The album consists of a compilation of the band's earlier singles from the late-1970s to the early-1980s.

== Track listing ==
Disc 1: Live
No.	Title	Writer(s)	Length
1.	"Part A"	Tony Fisher; Robert Reed	14:02
2.	"Part B"	Tony Fisher; Robert Reed	13:43
3.	"Part C"	Tony Fisher; Robert Reed	14:56
4.	"Part D"	Tony Fisher; Robert Reed	15:14

Disc 2: Early Singles
No.	Title	Writer(s)	Length
1.	"Super Grit"	Chester Davis; Tony Fisher; Robert Reed; Taylor Reed	10:18
2.	"E-Flat Boogie"	Chester Davis; Tony Fisher; Robert Reed; Taylor Reed	5:26
3.	"Hollyrock"	Chester Davis; Tony Fisher; Robert Reed; Taylor Reed	4:39
4.	"Roll with It"	Chester Davis; Tony Fisher; Robert Reed; Taylor Reed	7:16
5.	"Latin Funk"	Chester Davis; Tony Fisher; Robert Reed; Taylor Reed	5:03
6.	"Get Down With Your Get Down"	Tony Fisher; Robert Reed	8:43
7.	"Trouble Funk Express (Trans Europe Express)"	Ralf Hütter; Florian Schneider; Emil Schult	6:46
8.	"So Early in the Morning"	James Avery; Tony Fisher; Robert Reed; Taylor Teed	7:04
Total length:			1:56:28

== Personnel ==
- James Avery – electronic keyboards
- Mack Carey – percussions
- Chester Davis – guitar
- Tony Fisher – bass guitar
- Emmett Nixon – drums
- Gerald Reed – trombone
- Robert Reed – keyboards, trombone
- Taylor Reed – trumpet
- David Rudd – tenor saxophone
- Daniel Hersch – remastering
- Bill Inglot – remastering
