= Say What! (Trouble Funk album) =

Live album by Trouble Funk
- Released: 1986
- Recorded: July 1986
- Genre: Go-go; old-school hip hop
- Length: 36:10
- Label: 4th & B'way; Island
- Producer: Reo Edwards(exec); Maxx Kidd (exec); Robert Reed; Tony Fisher; James Avery

Trouble Funk chronology
Saturday Night Live (1983)	Say What! (1986)	Trouble Over Here (1987)

Professional ratings
Review scores
Source	Rating
Robert Christgau	B+
Los Angeles Times	3.5/4 stars

Say What! is a live album released in 1986 by the Washington, D.C.–based go-go band Trouble Funk. The album was recorded live in London, England, during the summer of 1986.

== Track listing ==
Side A

1. "Gilly Intro" – 0:46
2. "A-Groove" – 4:25
3. "Funk By Numbers" – 3:22
4. "Pump Me Up" – 8:32

Side B

1. "Let's Get Small" – 6:08
2. "Percussion Solos" – 6:23
3. "Drop the Bomb" – 6:34

== Personnel ==
- Robert "Dyke" Reed – electric guitar, keyboards, vocals
- Tony Fisher – lead vocals, bass guitar
- James Avery – keyboards, vocals
- Taylor Reed – trumpet, vocals
- Timothy "T-Bone" David – percussions, vocals
- MacCarey – drums, percussions
- Alonzo Robinson – percussions, vocals
- Dave Rudd – saxophone, vocal
- Dean Harris – trumpet, vocals
- Chester Davis – electric guitar

== Critical reception ==
Say What! was ranked number 19 among the "Albums of the Year" for 1986 by NME.
