= Mexsana =

Medicated powder brand

Mexsana is an antiseptic medicated powder made of corn starch with additives such as eucalyptus oil, lemon oil, and fragrance. It is used to relieve itching and chafing as well as to absorb perspiration. The product is also used to treat severely chapped skin and other minor skin irritations.

A different medicated powder with the similar name of Mexana is sold in the Dominican Republic.

== Process ==
The powder, mineral of less hardness in the Mohs scale, is the source that gives the name to the generic product used for personal hygienic purposes, and forms around 85% of the composition of the brand.

Initially, packages filled with huge amounts of this material, arranged in sacks of 25 kilograms each, are placed in warehouses that technically isolate the daily contamination, due to a sophisticated air flow mechanism.

== In popular culture ==
A can of Mexsana brand heat powder can be found on the back of the Greatest Hits album of Mötley Crüe.

== Products available by country ==
=== Colombia ===
The brand has both powder and spray products available in the Colombian market (made by Bayer Andina):

=== Powder ===
- Talcos Mexsana
- Lady Mexsana
- Mexsana Avena
- mexsana nacional
- Independiente mexsana fe
- millo mexsana
- colsana
- argensana
- perusana
- brasana

=== Sprays ===
- Mexsana Pies
- Lady Mexsana Antibacterial
- Mexsana Pies Antiperspirant
- Mexsana Pies Ultra
- Mexsana Pies Avena

=== United States ===
As of 2025, Mexsana medicated powder is distributed in the US by Bayer HealthCare LLC.
