= Greatest Hits Live =

Greatest Hits Live may refer to:

== Music albums ==
- Greatest Hits Live (2 Plus 1 album)
- Greatest Hits Live (April Wine album)
- Greatest Hits Live 2003, by April Wine
- Greatest Hits Live (Diana Ross album)
- Greatest Hits Live (Diesel album)
- Greatest Hits Live (Earth, Wind & Fire album)
- Greatest Hits Live! (Lita Ford album)
- Greatest Hits Live (Ace Frehley album)
- Greatest Hits Live! (Jaki Graham album)
- Greatest Hits Live (Hall & Oates album)
- Greatest Hits/Live, by Heart
- Greatest Hits Live (The Jets album)
- Greatest Hits Live (Journey album)
- Greatest Hits – Live (Don McLean album)
- Greatest Hits Live (Ramones album)
- Greatest Hits Live (Roy Orbison album)
- Greatest Hits Live! (Sammy Hagar album)
- Greatest Hits Live! (Saxon album)
- Greatest Hits Live (Boz Scaggs album)
- Greatest Hits Live (Carly Simon album)
- Greatest Hits Live (Sham 69 album),
- Greatest Hits Live (Starz album)
- Greatest Hits Live (Stiff Little Fingers album)
- Greatest Hits Live (Strawbs album)
- Greatest Hits Live (Tina Arena album)
- Greatest Hits Live (War album)
- Greatest Hits Live (The Who album)
- Greatest Hits Live (Yes album)
- The Greatest Hits Live at Wembley Arena, by Atomic Kitten
- Greatest Hits: Live in Amsterdam, The Supremes album
- Greatest Hits: Live at the House of Blues, DJ Quick album
- Greatest Hits Live: The Encore Collection, Eddie Money album
- Greatest Hits Live: Vancouver 1986, Donovan album

== Tours ==
- Greatest Hits Live! (tour), a concert tour by The Saturdays
- Greatest Hits Live (Take That), a concert tour by Take That

== Other albums ==
- In Concert (King Biscuit), America album
- King Biscuit Flower Hour: Bachman–Turner Overdrive
- King Biscuit Flower Hour: Greatest Hits Live, Emerson, Lake & Palmer album

== See also ==
- List of greatest hits albums
- List of albums titled Live
