= Droppin' Bombs =

Compilation album by Trouble Funk
- Released: August 25, 1998
- Genre: Go-go; funk; old-school hip hop
- Length: 1:38:20
- Label: Harmless Records
- Producer: Reo Edwards; Robert Reed; Tony Fisher; Rob Fraboni

Trouble Funk chronology
Early Singles (1997)	Droppin' Bombs (1998)	All the Way Live (2000)

Professional ratings
Review scores
Source	Rating
AllMusic	4.5/5 stars
ARTISTdirect	4.5/5 stars
musicHound R&B	(4/5)
The Rolling Stone Album Guide	4/5 stars

Droppin' Bombs (also titled as Droppin' Bombs: The Definitive Trouble Funk) is a double-compilation album released on August 25, 1998, by the Washington, D.C.–based go-go band Trouble Funk.

== Track listing ==
Disc 1

1. "Don't Touch That Stereo" – 5:56
2. "Pump Me Up" – 6:33
3. "Drop the Bomb" – 5:55
4. "Don't Try To Use Me" – 6:13
5. "Trouble Funk Express" – 6:40
6. "Hey Fellas" – 7:12
7. "Supergrit" – 10:13

Disc 2

1. "So Early in the Morning" – 7:03
2. "Freaky Situation" – 3:58
3. "Let's Get Small" – 5:33
4. "Say What" – 5:13
5. "E Flat Boogie" – 8:47
6. "Still Smokin'" – 5:08
7. "Good to Go" – 8:04
8. "I'm Chillin'" (featuring Kurtis Blow) – 5:52

== Personnel ==
- Tony Fisher – bass guitar
- Emmett Nixon – drums
- Robert Reed – keyboards, trombone
- James Avery – keyboards
- Chester Davis – electric guitar
- Timothy Smith – percussion
- Mack Carey – percussion
- Dennis "Fatz" Sterling – percussion, rototoms, cowbell
- David Rudd – saxophone
- Gerald Reed – trombone
- Taylor Reed – trumpet
