= Greatest Hits Volume One =

Greatest Hits Volume One (or variants) may refer to:

- Greatest Hits Volume I (Barry Manilow album), 1989
- Greatest Hits Volume 1 (Beatles album), 1966
- Greatest Hits Volume One (Billy "Crash" Craddock album), 1974
- Greatest Hits, Vol. 1 (Blue Rodeo album), 2001
- Greatest Hits Volume 1 (Cockney Rejects album), 1980
- Greatest Hits, Vol. 1 (Doug Stone album), 1994
- Greatest Hits, Vol. 1 (Flaming Lips album), 2018
- Greatest Hits, Vol. 1 (Johnny Cash album), 1967
- Greatest Hits, Vol. 1 (Korn album), 2004
- Greatest Hits Volume One (Mando Diao album), 2012
- Greatest Hits Vol. 1 (Mental As Anything album), 1986
- Greatest Hits, Vol. 1 (New Edition album), 1991
- Greatest Hits, Vol. 1 (Nicky Jam album), 2014
- Greatest Hits, Volume 1 (Randy Travis album), 1992
- Greatest Hits Volume 1 (Rascal Flatts album), 2008
- Greatest Hits, Vol. 1 (Rare Essence album), 1995
- Greatest Hits, Vol. 1 (Ray Stevens album), 1987
- Greatest Hits, Vol. 1 (Rod Stewart album), 1979
- Greatest Hits, Vol. 1 (Phil Vassar album), 2006
- Greatest Hits: Volume One (The Bob & Tom Show album), 1999
- Greatest Hits Volume One (Toby Keith album), 1998
- Greatest Hits, Vol. 1: The Player Years, 1983–1988, a 1993 album by Too Short
- The Greatest Hits – Volume 1: 20 Good Vibrations, a 1995 album by The Beach Boys
- Greatest Hits! Part 1, a 1998 album by Vengaboys

== See also ==
- List of greatest hits albums
- Greatest hits
- Greatest Hits Volume Two (disambiguation)
- Greatest Hits Volume Three (disambiguation)
