= All the Way Live =

Compilation album by Trouble Funk
- Released: June 21, 2000
- Genre: Go-go; funk; old-school hip hop
- Length: 47:42
- Label: Swollen; Tuff City
- Producer: Robert Reed; Tony Fisher; James Avery

Trouble Funk chronology
Droppin' Bombs (1998)	All the Way Live (2000)	E Flat Boogie (2000)

Professional ratings
Review scores
Source	Rating
AllMusic	4/5 stars
ARTISTdirect	4/5 stars
musicHound R&B	3/5
The Rolling Stone Album Guide	4/5 stars

All the Way Live is a compilation album released on June 21, 2000, by the Washington, D.C.–based go-go band Trouble Funk.

== Track listing ==
1. "Full Blast Intro" – 1:45
2. "Who We Gonna Put on Display" – 2:51
3. "Mac Attack" – 0:55
4. "Left Handed Blunt" – 3:28
5. "Make it Mellow" – 4:55
6. "Fired Up" – 4:40
7. "Fall Down" – 5:49
8. "Pump It Up" – 4:03
9. "The Socket" – 1:49
10. "Doc's Groove" – 3:37
11. "Hit'em Wit da Super Grit" – 8:11
12. "Rock da Clock" – 5:39

== Personnel ==
- Mark Carey – percussion
- Chester Davis – guitar
- Tony Fisher – bass, vocals
- Emmett Nixon – drums
- Robert Reed – keyboards, vocals
- Taylor Reed – trumpet
- David Rudd – saxophone
- Dennis "Fatz" Sterling – percussion
