= Greatest Hits Volume Two =

Greatest Hits Volume Two (or variants) may refer to any of the following albums:

- Greatest Hits Vol. 2 (ABBA album) (1979)
- Greatest Hits Volume 2 (Beatles album) (1967)
- Greatest Hits II (Clint Black album) (2001)
- Greatest Hits, Vol. 2 (Johnny Cash album) (1971)
- Greatest Hits II (Kenny Chesney album) (2009)
- Greatest Hits, Volume II (Chicago album) (1981)
- Greatest Hits Vol. II (Gloria Estefan album) (2001)
- Greatest Hits, Vol. 2 (Marvin Gaye album) (1967)
- Greatest Hits Volume II (Alan Jackson album) (2003)
- Greatest Hits Volume II (1985) by Billy Joel
- Greatest Hits 2 (Journey album) (2011)
- Greatest Hits Volume Two (The Judds album) (1991)
- Greatest Hits 2 (Toby Keith album) (2004)
- GHV2 (2001) by Madonna
- Greatest Hits Vol. II (Barry Manilow album) (1983)
- Greatest Hits Volume Two (Reba McEntire album) (1993)
- Greatest Hits, Vol. 2 (Ronnie Milsap album) (1985)
- Greatest Hits, Vol. 2 (The Miracles album) (1968)
- Greatest Hits II (Queen album) (1991)
- Greatest Hits, Volume 2 (Linda Ronstadt album) (1980)
- Greatest Hits Volume Two (George Strait album) (1987)
- Greatest Hits Volume 2 (James Taylor album) (2000)
- Greatest Hits, Vol. 2 (Temptations album) (1970)
- Greatest Hits, Volume 2 (Randy Travis album) (1992)
- Greatest Hits Volume 2 (Hank Williams Jr. album) (1972)
- Greatest Hits Volume II ("Weird Al" Yankovic album) (1994)

It may also refer to other albums that include the phrase "Greatest Hits Volume Two":

- American Man: Greatest Hits Volume II (2007) by Trace Adkins
- The Greatest Hits – Volume 2: 20 More Good Vibrations (1999) by The Beach Boys
- The Best of The Byrds: Greatest Hits, Volume II (1972)
- John Denver's Greatest Hits, Volume 2 (1977)
- Bob Dylan's Greatest Hits Vol. II (1971)
- Eagles Greatest Hits, Vol. 2 (1982)
- ELO's Greatest Hits Vol. 2 (1992) by Electric Light Orchestra
- Al Green's Greatest Hits, Vol. 2 (1977)
- Elton John's Greatest Hits Volume II (1977)
- Reflected: Greatest Hits Vol. 2 (2006) by Tim McGraw
- Olivia's Greatest Hits Vol. 2 (1982) by Olivia Newton-John
- Frank Sinatra's Greatest Hits, Vol. 2 (1972)
- Styx Greatest Hits Part 2 (1995)
- Hank Williams, Jr.'s Greatest Hits, Vol. 2 (1985)

== See also ==
- List of greatest hits albums
- Greatest hits
- Greatest Hits Volume One (disambiguation)
- Greatest Hits Volume Three (disambiguation)
