= Greatest Hits (disambiguation) =

Greatest Hits albums are compilations of successful, previously released songs by a particular music artist or band. For a list of such albums, see List of greatest hits albums.

Greatest Hits or variants may also refer to:

== Music ==
=== Non-compilation albums ===
- Greatest Hits (Phil Ochs album), seventh and final studio album by Phil Ochs, 1970
- The Greatest Hits (Funkoars album), second studio album by Funkoars, 2006
- The Greatest Hit (Money Mountain), debut studio album by Blue Orchids, 1982
- Greatest Hits (Kari Peitsamo ja Ankkuli album), fifth studio album by Kari Peitsamo ja Ankkuli, featuring cover versions of his favourite songs, 1980
- Greatest Hits (Remo Drive album), first studio album by Remo Drive, 2017
- Greatest Hits (Waterparks album), fourth studio album by Waterparks, 2021

=== Songs ===
- "The Greatest Hit" (song), a no.100 charting song by Annie
- "The Greatest Hit", song by Six Finger Satellite from Paranormalized

== Other media ==
- "Greatest Hits" (Lost), an episode of Lost
- Greatest Hits (TV series), a television series
- Greatest Hits (comics), a six-issue comic book limited series
- Greatest Hits Radio, a radio station in the United Kingdom
- PlayStation Hits (formerly Greatest Hits), a set of Sony video games re-released at a lower price

== See also ==
- Greatest Hits Tour (disambiguation)
- Greatest Hits & More (disambiguation)
- Greatest Hits (Kenny Rogers album)
