= The Complete Collection of Trouble Funk =

Compilation album by Trouble Funk
- Released: July 10, 2015
- Studio: Sigma Sound, Philadelphia; Omega Studios; Bias Studios; Room 10 Studio
- Genre: Go-go; old-school hip hop
- Length: 2:31:16
- Label: TF Records
- Producer: Tony Fisher; Robert Reed; James Avery; Reo Edwards

Trouble Funk chronology
35th Anniversary Live (2014)	The Complete Collection of Trouble Funk (2015)	Old School New School (2017)

The Complete Collection of Trouble Funk is a double-compilation album release in 2015 by the American go-go band Trouble Funk. The album was dedicated to the memories of Robert Reed, Mac Cary, Lonnie Duckett, and Herbert Hicks.

== Track listing ==
Disc 1:

1. "E Flat Boogie" – 8:45
2. "Roll Wit It" – 7:10
3. "Pump Me Up" – 6:32
4. "Let's Get Small" – 5:34
5. "Trouble Funk Express" – 6:41
6. "So Early in the Morning" – 6:59
7. "Drop the Bomb" – 6:00
8. "Hey Fellas" – 7:12
9. "Super Grit" – 10:15
10. "The Beat" – 9:02

Disc 2:

1. "Beat 2" – 9:04
2. "Don't Touch That Stereo" – 6:07
3. "Say What" – 5:18
4. "Let's Get Hot" – 4:43
5. "Get on Up" – 4:50
6. "Hollyrock" – 4:36
7. "Latin Funk" – 5:00
8. "Get Down With Your Get Down" – 8:42
9. "Still Smokin" – 5:07
10. "Good Times" – 8:04
11. "All Aboard" – 5:16
12. "Dance to Troubles Beat" – 6:23
13. "Freaky Situation" – 3:56

== Personnel ==
- Tony "Big Tony" Fisher – lead vocals, bass guitar
- Robert "Syke Dyke" Reed – vocals, electric guitar, keyboards
- James "Doc" Avery – vocals, keyboards
- Taylor "Monster Baby" Reed – vocals, trumpet, keyboards
- Chester "Boogie" Davis – lead guitar, vocals
- Emmett "EJ Roxx" Nixon – lead vocals, drums
- Mac "Shorty Mac" Cary – drums, percussion
- Timothy "Tee Bone" David – congas, percussion
- Dean "Chops" Harris – trumpet
- Dave "Cruddy" Rudd – saxophone, percussion
- Keith Bazemore – trombone
- Garland "Iceberg Slim" Walker – guest vocals
- James Logan – CD artwork
- Reo Edwards – mixing, producer
