= Greatest Hits & More =

Greatest Hits & More may refer to:

- Greatest Hits & More (Helena Paparizou album), 2011 pop album
- Greatest Hits & More (The Who album), 2009 rock album
- Greatest Hits ... And More, a 2006 album by 10cc
- Greatest Hit...and More, a 2006 album by Reel Big Fish

== See also ==
- Greatest Hits & More More More, 2007 album by Bananarama
- Greatest Hits (disambiguation)
