= Checkmate (Roger Christian album) =

Studio album by Roger Christian
- Released: 1989
- Studios: Sorcerer Sound Recording Studios, New York City
- Genres: Soul music, pop, funk
- Length: 38:13
- Label: Island
- Producer: Gary Katz

Roger Christian chronology
Checkmate (1989)	Better Friends (1992)

Singles from Roger Christian
- 1. "Take It From Me" Released: September 1989; 2. "Worlds Apart" Released: February 1989

Checkmate is the debut album of British singer Roger Christian. It was produced by Gary Katz and released on 9 October 1989 by Island Records. The album features background vocals by the Persuasions on three tracks, “Stay With Me Tonight”, “Chains” and “Mwanzia”.

Two singles were released from the album, “Take It From Me” and “Worlds Apart”, peaking on the UK Charts respectively at No. 63 peaking at No. 97. The album and singles received international airplay, including West Germany and Spain.

== Background ==
An original member of the Christians with his brothers Garry and Russell, Roger left the band to start a solo career. He wrote seven of the ten songs for his solo album with collaborators including Dan Hartman, Peter Vale, and Barry Parker.

== Critical reception ==
Kevin Murphy, for Record Mirror, compared Checkmate and Roger Christian as bearing “many of the hallmarks of his brothers in the Christians, opining “There’s Roger’s rich, soulful voice with its shrill reminders of Johnny Nash and warm memories of Marvin Gaye coursing through its veins”. He calls “Loving You Is So Easy” a “relaxed smooth Sam Cooke pastiche”, remarking on the “uptempo brashness” of “Take It From Me”, and describes “Mwanzia” as “spiritually refreshing and as warm as evening cocoa.”

Music & Media wrote, “A confident solo debut largely made of gritty R&B material…straightforward, economical production by Gary Katz goes together well with the brassy arrangements and Christian’s straight-from-the-heart vocals”.

== Singles ==
Music & Media praised “Take It From Me”, calling it “A great debut in a Motown style, very like The Drifters.”

== Track listings ==
Credits adapted from album liner notes.

Side one
No.	Title	Writer(s)	Length
1.	"Take It From Me"	Dan Hartman, Roger Christian	3:22
2.	"Checkmate"	Barry Parker, Bob Galvin, Christian	4:03
3.	"Stop Start"	Parker, Christian	3:43
4.	"Stop Yourself From Falling"	James Wraith	3:48
5.	"Stay With Me Tonight"	Parker, Christian, Tony Griffin	1:17

Side two
No.	Title	Writer(s)	Length
1.	"Loving You Is So Easy"	Hartman, Christian	3:56
2.	"Chains"	Wraith	4:18
3.	"Worlds Apart"	Miles Waters, Peter Vale, Christian	3:50
4.	"Mwanzia"	Billie Hughes, Roxanne Seeman	5:02
5.	"Love Will Find A Way"	Parker, Galvin, Christian	3:41

- 4 Track Vinyl Single Sided Promo
1. "Worlds Apart”
2. "Stop Yourself From Falling”
3. "Take It From Me”
4. "Mwanzia”

== Personnel ==
Credits adapted from album liner notes.

- Roger Christian – vocals, backing vocals
- Dan Hartman – backing vocals
- Frank Floyd – backing vocals
- Jimmy Hayes – backing vocals
- Joe Russell – backing vocals
- Sam Butler – backing vocals
- Gary Katz - producer
- Michael H. Brauer – mixer

Mastered at The Townhouse
