= In Times of Trouble =

Studio album by Trouble Funk
- Released: 1983
- Genre: Go-go
- Length: 37:46
- Label: D.E.T.T.
- Producers: Reo Edwards(exec); Maxx Kidd (exec); Robert Reed; Tony Fisher; James Avery

Trouble Funk chronology
| Drop the Bomb (1982) | In Times of Trouble (1983) | Saturday Night Live (1983) |

In Times of Trouble is a studio album released in 1983 by the Washington, D.C.–based go-go band Trouble Funk. It was packaged with a live disc.

== Critical reception ==
Professional ratings
Review scores
| Source | Rating |
|---|---|
| Robert Christgau | B+ |
| MusicHound R&B | 3.5/5 stars |
| The Philadelphia Inquirer | 3/5 stars |

Trouser Press noted that "the two sides of studio material have nowhere near the juice of the debut."

== Track listing ==
Side A

1. "Spintime" – 4:50
2. "In Times of Trouble" – 5:23
3. "Share Your Love" – 5:07
4. "Good Times" – 4:29

Side B

1. "Say What" – 5:21
2. "Freaky Situation" – 4:08
3. "Funk n Roll" – 4:09
4. "Good Times" – 4:29

== Personnel ==
- Robert "Dyke" Reed – electric guitar, keyboards, vocals
- Tony Fisher – lead vocals, bass guitar
- James Avery – keyboards, vocals
- Taylor Reed – trumpet, vocals
- Timothy "T-Bone" David – percussions, vocals
- MacCarey – drums, percussions
- Alonzo Robinson – percussions, vocals
- Dave Rudd – saxophone, vocal
- Dean Harris – trumpet, vocals
- Chester Davis – electric guitar
