= Greatest Hits Volume Three =

Greatest Hits Volume Three (or variants) may refer to:

- Greatest Hits Vol. III (Alabama album), 1994
- Greatest Hits Volume III (Billy Joel album), 1997
- Greatest Hits Volume III (Barry Manilow album), 1989
- Greatest Hits 3 (Ensemble Renaissance album), 1984
- Greatest Hits Vol. III (The Everly Brothers album), 1977
- Greatest Hits, Vol. 3 (Hank Williams Jr. album), 1989
- Greatest Hits, Vol. 3 (Johnny Cash album), 1978
- Greatest Hits, Vol. 3 (Ronnie Milsap album), 1991
- Greatest Hits Vol 3 (Olivia Newton-John album), 1982
- Greatest Hits 3 (The Oak Ridge Boys album), 1989
- Greatest Hits III (Queen album), 1999
- Greatest Hits Vol. 3 (The Supremes album), 1969
- Greatest Hits 3 (Tim McGraw album), 2008
- Greatest Hits Vol. III (Umphrey's McGee album), 1998

It may also refer to other albums that include the phrase "Greatest Hits Volume Three":

- Greatest Hits Volume Three: Best of the Brother Years 1970–1986 (2000) by The Beach Boys
- John Denver's Greatest Hits, Volume 3 (1984)
- Bob Dylan's Greatest Hits Volume 3 (1994)
- Elton John's Greatest Hits Vol. 3
- Greatest Hits Volume III: I'm a Survivor (2001) by Reba McEntire

== See also ==
- List of greatest hits albums
- Greatest hits
- Greatest Hits Volume One (disambiguation)
- Greatest Hits Volume Two (disambiguation)
