= Heavier Than a Death in the Family =

Live album by Les Rallizes Dénudés
- Released: 2002
- Recorded: 12 March 1977; 1973 ("People Can Choose")
- Venues: Shakai Kyoiku Kaikan, Tachikawa, Tokyo, Japan
- Genres: Psychedelic rock; noise rock
- Length: 74:42
- Label: (not on label)

Les Rallizes Dénudés chronology
OZ Days (1973)	Heavier Than a Death in the Family (2002)	Blind Baby Has Its Mother's Eyes (2003)

Professional ratings
Review scores
Source	Rating
AllMusic	4/5 stars

Heavier Than a Death in the Family is a bootleg live album by Japanese noise rock band, Les Rallizes Dénudés. Most of the songs were recorded at a performance on the 12th March 1977; the fifth track is taken from a 1973 performance. The album was released in 2002. In 2010, Phoenix Records repressed the album on vinyl and CD.

== Background ==
Like most of the band's work, this album is a bootleg and wasn't authorized by the band for its release. The recordings are taken mostly from a performance at Shakai Kyoiku Kaikan on 12 March 1977 (as heard on a previous live album, '77 Live), except for "Wilderness of False Flowers" (mislabelled as "People Can Choose"), taken from a 1973 performance.

== Reception ==
In a review for AllMusic, Phil Freeman writes that the "sound is primitive guitar rock à la the Velvet Underground crossed with the Troggs, but their simple guitar riffs are fed through so much reverb, fuzz, and echo that it's like a dub mix of psychedelic garage rock... it retains a primal rock & roll throb...[the album] is essential listening for anyone who wants to understand [the Japanese underground rock] scene."

It reached #3 on Julian Cope's top 50 albums of Japanese rock, as found in his 2007 non-fiction book Japrocksampler. Cope writes, "It's relentless to the point of becoming meditative, and cylindrical to the point of being useful".

== Track listing ==
No.	Title	Length
1.	"Strung Out Deeper Than the Night"	15:32
2.	"The Night Collectors"	8:32
3.	"Night of the Assassins"	12:07
4.	"Enter the Mirror"	11:45
5.	"People Can Choose"	10:33
6.	"Ice Fire"	16:13
Total length:		74:42

== Personnel ==
Adapted from CD liner notes:

- Mizutani – vocals, lead guitar
- Nakamura Takeshi – guitar
- Hiroshi – bass guitar
- Mimaki Toshirou – drums
