= E Flat Boogie =

Compilation album by Trouble Funk
- Released: 2000
- Genre: Go-go; old-school hip hop
- Length: 67:24
- Label: Funky Delicacies
- Producer: Tony Fisher; Robert Reed; Aaron Fuchs

Trouble Funk chronology
All the Way Live (2000)	E Flat Boogie (2000)	Live & Early Singles (2004)

Professional ratings
Review scores
Source	Rating
AllMusic	4.5/5 stars
ARTISTdirect	4/5 stars
musicHound R&B	(4/5)
The Rolling Stone Album Guide	4/5 stars

E Flat Boogie is a compilation album released in 2000 by the Washington, D.C.–based go-go band Trouble Funk. The album consists of a compilations of the band earlier singles from the late-1970s to the early-1980s.

== Track listing ==
Side A
No.	Title	Writer(s)	Length
1.	"E Flat Boogie"	James Avery; Robert Reed	8:47
2.	"Let's Get Small"	Tony Fisher; Robert Reed	5:33
3.	"Pump Me Up"	James Avery; Tony Fisher; Robert Reed	8:47

Side B
No.	Title	Writer(s)	Length
1.	"So Early in the Morning"	Tony Fisher; Robert Reed	7:03
2.	"Hey Fellas"	James Avery; Tony Fisher; Robert Reed	7:12
3.	"Trouble Funk Express"	Ralf Hütter; Florian Schneider; Emil Schult	6:40

CD version (bonus tracks)
No.	Title	Writer(s)	Length
4.	"E Flat Boogie (instrumental version)"	James Avery; Robert Reed	8:19
5.	"Let's Get Small (instrumental version)"	Tony Fisher; Robert Reed	9:28
6.	"Trouble Funk Express (instrumental version)"	Ralf Hütter; Florian Schneider; Emil Schult	6:33

== Personnel ==
- Chester "T-Bone" Davis – electric guitar
- Tony Fisher – lead vocals, bass guitar
- Bootsy Collins – bass guitar, drums, electric guitar, keyboard
- Emmett Nixon – drums
- James Avery – keyboards
- Robert Reed – keyboards
- Mack Carey – percussions, congas
- Timothy David – percussions, congas
- David Rudd – tenor saxophone
- Gerald Reed – trombone
- Taylor Reed – trombone, trumpet
