= Trouble Over Here =

Studio album by Trouble Funk
- Released: 1987
- Genre: Go-go; funk; old-school hip hop
- Length: 39:57
- Label: Island Records
- Producer: Bootsy Collins; Maxx Kidd; Rob Fraboni

Trouble Funk chronology
Say What! (1986)	Trouble Over Here (1987)	P.A. Classics, Vol. 1 (1992)

Professional ratings
Review scores
Source	Rating
AllMusic	3/5 stars
ARTISTdirect	3/5 stars
musicHound R&B	(1.5/5)
Robert Christgau	B

Trouble Over Here (also titled Trouble Over Here, Trouble Over There) is a studio album by American go-go band Trouble Funk, released in 1987 by Island Records.

== Track listing ==
No.	Title	Producer(s)	Length
1.	"Trouble" (featuring Vicky Vee)	Bootsy Collins	5:26
2.	"Woman of Principle" (featuring Renee Geyner)	Bootsy Collins; James Avery; Rob Fraboni	3:31
3.	"Hey Tee Bone" (featuring Kurtis Blow and Renee Geyner)	Rob Fraboni; Tony Fisher	5:25
4.	"All Over the World"	Rob Fraboni; Robert Reed	4:16
5.	"Stroke"	Rob Fraboni; Taylor Reed	3:30
6.	"New Money" (featuring Vicky Vee and Eddie Martinez)	Bootsy Collins	7:04
7.	"Sexy" (featuring Alonzo Robinson)	Rob Fraboni; Robert Reed	3:43
8.	"Break It Up" (featuring Kurtis Blow)	Kurtis Blow; Rob Fraboni; Robert Reed	5:24
Total length:			39:57

== Personnel ==
- Chester "T-Bone" Davis – lead guitar
- Tony Fisher – lead vocals, bass guitar
- Bootsy Collins – bass guitar, drums, electric guitar, keyboard
- Emmett Nixon – drums
- James Avery – keyboards
- Robert Reed – keyboards
- Mack Carey – percussion, congas
- Timothy David – percussion, congas
- David Rudd – saxophone
- Gerald Reed – trombone
- Taylor Reed – trombone, trumpet
