= What's in a Word =

Single by The Christians

from the album Happy in Hell
- B-side: "Happy in Hell"
- Released: 1992
- Length: 4:57
- Label: Island
- Songwriter: Henry Priestman
- Producers: Martyn Phillips; The Christians

The Christians singles chronology
"Greenbank Drive" (1990)	"What's in a Word" (1992)	"Father" (1992)

"What's in a Word" is a song by English band the Christians. Written by Henry Priestman, it was their lead single from their third studio album Happy in Hell, and was released in August 1992. It reached the top 20 in Italy and France, spending 19 weeks in the top 50 of the latter country. In addition, it was a top-40 hit in the United Kingdom and the Netherlands and a top-60 hit in Germany.

== Track listings ==
- 7" single
1. "What's in a Word" – 4:57
2. "Happy in Hell" – 4:27
- 12" single
1. "What's in a Word" (7" version) – 4:57
2. "Happy in Hell" – 5:08
3. "You Never Know" – 5:26
4. "What's in a Word" (full length version) – 6:52

== Charts ==
Weekly chart performance
Chart (1992)	Peak position
Australia (Kent Music Report)	193
Europe (Eurochart Hot 100)	62
Europe (European AC Radio)	3
Europe (European Hit Radio)	4
France (SNEP)	17
Germany (GfK)	60
Italy (Musica e dischi)	17
Netherlands (Dutch Top 40)	31
Netherlands (Single Top 100)	38
UK Singles (OCC)	33
