= The Greatest =

The Greatest may refer to:

== Film and television ==
- The Greatest (1977 film), a 1977 film starring Muhammad Ali
- The Greatest (2009 film), a 2009 film featuring Pierce Brosnan and Susan Sarandon
- The Greatest (VH1 TV series), a VH1 series of countdowns
- The Greatest (2026 TV series), a 2026 television series biopic of Muhammad Ali
- The Greatest @Home Videos, a CBS video clip show
- "The Greatest", a 2013 Wander Over Yonder episode

== Music ==
- The Greatest!! Count Basie Plays, Joe Williams Sings Standards, 1956
- The Greatest (Ian Brown album), 2005
- The Greatest (Cat Power album), 2006
- The Greatest (Phunk Junkeez album), 2010
- The Greatest (Diana Ross album), 2011
- "The Greatest" (Kenny Rogers song), 1999
- "The Greatest" (Michelle Williams song), 2008
- "The Greatest" (Sia song), 2016
- "The Greatest" (Six60 song), 2019
- "The Greatest" (Lana Del Rey song), 2019
- "The Greatest" (Rod Wave song), 2020
- "The Greatest" (Billie Eilish song), 2024
- "The Greatest", 2016 song by Reks from his album The Greatest X
- "The Greatest", 2001 song by Scene 23 from the album Music From The Show Popstars 2: Introducing Scene 23
- "The Greatest", a 2002 cover of the Scene 23 song by S Club from their album Seeing Double

== Other uses ==
- Muhammad Ali (1942–2016), American heavyweight boxing champion
- The Greatest: My Own Story, a 1975 autobiography by Muhammad Ali

== See also ==
- Greatest (disambiguation)
