= Early Singles (Trouble Funk album) =

Compilation album by Trouble Funk
- Released: March 11, 1997
- Genre: Funk; go-go
- Length: 55:15
- Label: Infinite Zero
- Producer: Robert Reed; Tony Fisher

Trouble Funk chronology
Hittin' Hard Party Classics, Vol. 2 (1995)	Early Singles (1997)	Droppin' Bombs: The Definitive Trouble Funk (1998)

Professional ratings
Review scores
Source	Rating
AllMusic	4.5/5 stars
ARTISTdirect	4/5 stars
musicHound R&B	(4/5)
The Rolling Stone Album Guide	4/5 stars
Tom Hull	A−

Early Singles is a compilation album released on March 11, 1997, by the Washington, D.C.–based go-go band Trouble Funk. The album consists of a compilations of the band earlier singles from the late-70s to the early-80s.

== Track listing ==
No.	Title	Writer(s)	Length
1.	"Super Grit"	Tony Fisher; Robert Reed	10:18
2.	"E-Flat Boogie"	Tony Fisher; Robert Reed	5:26
3.	"Hollyrock"	Tony Fisher; Robert Reed	4:39
4.	"Roll with It"	Tony Fisher; Robert Reed	7:16
5.	"Latin Funk"	Chester Davis; Tony Fisher; Robert Reed; Taylor Reed	5:03
6.	"Get Down With Your Get Down"	Tony Fisher; Robert Reed	8:43
7.	"Trouble Funk Express (Trans Europe Express)"	Ralf Hütter; Florian Schneider; Emil Schult	6:46
8.	"So Early in the Morning"	James Avery; Tony Fisher; Robert Reed; Taylor Teed	7:04
Total length:			55:15

== Personnel ==
- Tony Fisher – bass guitar, vocals
- Chester Davis – electric guitar
- James Avery – keyboards
- Robert Reed – keyboards, trombone
- Timothy David – percussion
- Mack Carey – percussion
- Taylor Reed – trumpet
- David Rudd – saxophone
- Gerald Reed – trombone
