= Saturday Night Live (album) =

Live album by Trouble Funk
- Released: 1983
- Genre: Go-go; funk; old-school hip hop
- Length: 31:01
- Label: Island; Polystar; T.T.E.D.
- Producer: Robert Reed; Tony Fisher; James Avery

Trouble Funk chronology
| In Times of Trouble (1983) | Saturday Night Live (1983) | Say What? (1986) |

Professional ratings
Review scores
| Source | Rating |
|---|---|
| AllMusic | 3/5 stars |
| ARTISTdirect | 3/5 stars |
| musicHound R&B | (3/5) |
| Robert Christgau | B+ |
| Los Angeles Times | 2.5/4 stars |
| The Rolling Stone Album Guide | 3/5 stars |

Saturday Night Live (also titled as Saturday Night Live! from Washington, D.C.) is a live album released in 1983 by the Washington, D.C.–based go-go band Trouble Funk.

== Track listing ==
Side A

1. "A-Groove" – 1:52
2. "That's What We're Talking About" – 6:07
3. "Take It to the Bridge"– 1:15
4. "Grip It" – 5:51

Side B

1. "Double Trouble" – 0:56
2. "4th Gear" – 2:17
3. "Give Me a Quick One" – 3:43
4. "Sleep On It" – 9:00

== Personnel ==
- Chester "T-Bone" Davis – lead guitar
- Tony Fisher – lead vocals, bass guitar
- Emmett Nixon – drums
- James Avery – keyboards
- Robert Reed – keyboards
- Mack Carey – percussion, congas
- Timothy David – percussion, congas
- David Rudd – saxophone
- Gerald Reed – trombone
- Taylor Reed – trombone, trumpet
