= '77 Live =

Live album by Les Rallizes Dénudés
- Released: August 15, 1991
- Recorded: March 12, 1977
- Genres: Psychedelic rock; noise rock
- Length: 100:47
- Label: Rivista

Les Rallizes Dénudés chronology
'67–'69 Studio et live (1991)	'77 Live (1991)	Mizutani / Les Rallizes Dénudés (1991)

'77 Live is a live album by Japanese experimental rock band Les Rallizes Dénudés. It was recorded in March 1977 before being released on CD in 1991.

== Background and composition ==
'77 Live is a recording of a Les Rallizes Dénudés concert performed at the Tachikawa Social Education Hall in Tokyo on March 12, 1977. The audio was captured reel to reel with a singular microphone resulting in an extremely loud, obliterated mix reminiscent of later noise rock. The individual tracks run between 8 and 25 minutes long, a result of the music being almost entirely improvised on stage.

== Track listing ==
Based on the original CD track listing.

Disc one
No.	Title	Length
1.	"Enter the Mirror"	11:30
2.	"夜、暗殺者の夜"	12:04
3.	"氷の炎"	16:12
4.	"記憶は遠い"	11:35

Disc two
No.	Title	Length
5.	"夜より深く"	15:32
6.	"夜の収穫者たち"	8:30
7.	"The Last One"	25:24
