= Words (The Christians song) =

1989 single by the Christians

Single by the Christians

from the album Colour
- B-side: "Long Gone"
- Released: 11 December 1989
- Length: 7:17
- Label: Island
- Songwriters: Henry Priestman, Seán Ó Riada
- Producer: Laurie Latham

The Christians singles chronology
"Ferry Cross the Mersey" (1989)	"Words" (1989)	"I Found Out" (1990)

Music video
- "Words" on YouTube

"Words" is a song by English band the Christians. It was the first single from their second album, Colour (1990). Released on 11 December 1989, the song reached number 18 on the UK Singles Chart and became a number-one hit in France, where it topped the SNEP chart for two weeks in May 1990. "Words" additionally became a top-10 hit in Belgium, Ireland, the Netherlands, and Spain.

== Song information ==
The group adapted a famous refrain of Irish folk heritage, known as "Mná na hÉireann", written by Seán Ó Riada, which translates as "Women of Ireland". It has been recorded by The Chieftains and Kate Bush among many others.

According to expert of French charts Elia Habib, the song has a "sweet both melody and performance".

The song's lyrics are written on the cover of the CD maxi and the vinyl.

This single had great success in France, although the group was not really known to the general public. The song achieved lesser success in the UK where it reached number 18 (as in Sweden) and was a failure in Germany.

In France, "Words" debuted at number 48 on the chart edition of 10 March 1990, climbed every week and reached number one for two weeks, and spent 11 weeks in the top ten and 19 weeks in the top 50. It was the band's best-selling single in France. The song was also a top ten hit in Belgium (Flanders), Ireland, Spain and the Netherlands.

== Music video ==
The song's music video is notable for stunning landscape, and features Port Isaac, Doyden Castle (Port Quin), and Boscastle in Cornwall, England.

== Track listings ==
- CD maxi
1. "Words" – 7:17
2. "Long Gone" – 3:22
3. "Funny Money" – 3:35
- 7-inch single
1. "Words" – 5:26
2. "Long Gone" – 3:22

== Charts ==
=== Weekly charts ===
Chart (1989–1990)	Peak position
Australia (ARIA Chart)	152
Belgium (Ultratop 50 Flanders)	10
Europe (Eurochart Hot 100)	8
Europe (European Airplay Top 50)	13
Finland (Suomen virallinen lista)	20
France (SNEP)	1
Ireland (IRMA)	6
Italy Airplay (Music & Media)	6
Netherlands (Dutch Top 40)	5
Netherlands (Single Top 100)	5
Spain (AFYVE)	4
Sweden (Sverigetopplistan)	18
UK Singles (OCC)	18

=== Year-end charts ===
Chart (1990)	Position
Belgium (Ultratop)	95
Europe (Eurochart Hot 100)	32
Europe (European Airplay Top 50)	25
Europe (Adult Contemporary)	8
Netherlands (Dutch Top 40)	41
Sweden (Topplistan)	99

== See also ==
- List of number-one singles of 1990 (France)
