= The Very Best of Sister Sledge 1973–93 =

Greatest hits album by Sister Sledge
- Released: 1993
- Genres: R&B; disco; soul; funk; pop
- Label: Rhino Entertainment
- Producers: Nile Rodgers; Bernard Edwards; Narada Michael Walden; George Duke; Tony Silvester; Bert de Coteaux; LeBaron Taylor; Phil Hurtt; Tony Bell; Sister Sledge

Alternative cover
- Original cover for the album

Professional ratings
Review scores
| Source | Rating |
|---|---|
| Melody Maker | (favorable) |
| Music Week | 4/5 stars |
| Select | 3/5 medals |

The Very Best of Sister Sledge 1973–93 is a greatest hits album by American vocal group Sister Sledge, released in 1993. Featuring the biggest hit singles of the group, the album also includes two new Sure Is Pure remixes of "We Are Family" and "Lost in Music", both released as singles in 1993 and reaching number five and 14 in the UK Singles Chart respectively.

== Track listing ==
| No. | Title | Writer(s) | Origin | Length |
|---|---|---|---|---|
| 1. | "We Are Family" | Nile Rodgers; Bernard Edwards | We Are Family (1979) | 3:26 |
| 2. | "He's the Greatest Dancer" | Rodgers; Edwards | We Are Family | 6:10 |
| 3. | "All American Girls" | Narada Michael Walden; Lisa Walden; Allee Willis; Joni Sledge | All American Girls (1981) | 3:53 |
| 4. | "Smile" | Kathy Sledge; Phil Lightfoot | Bet Cha Say That to All the Girls (1983) | 5:13 |
| 5. | "Love Don't You Go Through No Changes On Me" | Patrick Grant; Gwen Guthrie | Circle of Love (1975) | 3:22 |
| 6. | "Pretty Baby" | Rodgers; Edwards | Love Somebody Today (1980) | 4:00 |
| 7. | "Got to Love Somebody" | Rodgers; Edwards | Love Somebody Today | 3:35 |
| 8. | "Dancing On the Jagged Edge" | David Paul Bryant; Dennis Herring; Lorelei McBroom | When the Boys Meet the Girls (1985) | 3:33 |
| 9. | "Frankie" | Denise Rich | When the Boys Meet the Girls | 4:15 |
| 10. | "Lost in Music" | Rodgers; Edwards | We Are Family | 4:42 |
| 11. | "Thinking of You" | Rodgers; Edwards | We Are Family | 4:21 |
| 12. | "Mama Never Told Me" | Phil Hurtt; Tony Bell | non-album single (1973) | 3:18 |
| 13. | "Reach Your Peak" | Rodgers; Edwards | Love Somebody Today | 3:29 |
| 14. | "Let's Go On Vacation" | Rodgers; Edwards | Love Somebody Today | 3:14 |
| 15. | "My Guy" | Smokey Robinson | The Sisters (1982) | 3:44 |
| 16. | "All the Man I Need" (featuring David Simmons) | Dean Pitchford; Michael Gore | The Sisters | 4:06 |
| 17. | "We Are Family" (Sure Is Pure Remix Edit) | Rodgers; Edwards | previously unreleased (1993) | 3:56 |
| 18. | "Lost in Music" (Sure Is Pure Remix) | Rodgers; Edwards | previously unreleased (1993) | 5:07 |

== Personnel ==
Adapted from the album's liner notes.

Producers

- Nile Rodgers (tracks 1, 2, 6–11, 13, 14, 17, 18)
- Bernard Edwards (tracks 1, 2, 6, 7, 10, 11, 13, 14, 17, 18)
- Narada Michael Walden (track 3)
- George Duke (track 4)
- Tony Silvester & Bert de Coteaux (track 5)
- LeBaron Taylor, Phil Hurtt & Tony Bell (The Young Professionals; track 12)
- Sister Sledge (tracks 15, 16)

Additional personnel

- Mark Ralph – additional guitar (track 17)

== Charts ==
| Chart (1993) | Peak position |
|---|---|
| UK Albums (Official Charts) | 19 |

== Certifications ==
| Region | Certification | Certified units/sales |
|---|---|---|
| United Kingdom (BPI) | Silver | 60,000^{^} |
^{^} Shipments figures based on certification alone.
