= Greatest Hits – Live (Don McLean album) =

Live album by Don McLean
- Released: February 25, 1997
- Genre: Rock
- Label: Hip-O Records

Don McLean chronology
Solo (1995)	Greatest Hits – Live (1997)	Christmas Dreams (1997)

Greatest Hits - Live is an album by American singer-songwriter Don McLean, released in 1997.

== Track listing ==
=== Disk: 1 ===
1. "It's Just the Sun"
2. "Building My Body"
3. "Wonderful Baby"
4. "The Very Thought of You"
5. "Fool's Paradise"
6. "(You're So Square) Baby I Don't Care"
7. "You Have Lived"
8. "The Statue"
9. "Prime Time"
10. "American Pie"
11. "Left For Dead On The Road of Love"

=== Disk: 2 ===
1. "Believers"
2. "Sea Man"
3. "It's a Beautiful Life"
4. "Chain Lightning"
5. "Crazy Eyes"
6. "La Love You"
7. "Dream Lover" (Bobby Darrin)
8. "Crying" (Roy Orbison)
9. "Vincent (Starry Starry Night)"
