= Greatest Hits (The Association album) =

Greatest hits album by the Association
- Released: November 1968
- Recorded: 1966–1968
- Genres: Folk; pop; soft rock
- Length: 37:30
- Label: Warner Bros.
- Producers: Curt Boettcher; Jerry Yester; Bones Howe; The Association

The Association chronology
Birthday (1968)	Greatest Hits (1968)	Goodbye Columbus (1969)

Greatest Hits is the first compilation album by the Association, released in 1968 by Warner Bros. Records. The album peaked at #4 on the Billboard 200 album chart. In Canada the album reached #2 and was in the top 10 for 13 weeks. The RIAA certified the album 2× Platinum on June 1, 1989.

The autobiographical tune "Six Man Band", written by Terry Kirkman, was a new song which had also been released as a mono single in July 1968, then appeared in a stereo mix on this album. The version of "Enter the Young" that is on this collection is a re-recording of a track from their first LP. Despite the title, the album does not include the singles "Pandora's Golden Heebie Jeebies" (which charted at #35 in late 1966) or "Looking Glass" (which was a regional hit), using non-hits such as "Like Always" and "We Love Us" instead.

Some recordings on this album were encoded with the Haeco-CSG process.

== Critical reception ==
Professional ratings
Review scores
Source	Rating
AllMusic	4.5/5 stars
The Rolling Stone Album Guide	2/5 stars

Stephen Cook of AllMusic writes, "the majority of this hits collection focuses on the band's dreamy combination of polished folk, limber vocal arrangements, and wide-screen instrumental backdrops" and finishes the review by saying, "A great introduction to the band's prime work from the latter half of the '60s."

David Bowling reviews the album for Seattle P-I and writes, "No matter what success their albums may have achieved, they will always be remembered for their string of singles. Greatest Hits gathers these singles, plus a few other tracks in support, to form a soft rock and pop album that has withstood the test of time surprisingly well."

== Track listing ==
Side one
No.	Title	Writer(s)	Original album	Length
1.	"The Time It Is Today"	Russ Giguere	Birthday (1968)	2:14
2.	"Everything that Touches You"	Terry Kirkman	Birthday	3:19
3.	"Like Always"	Bob Alcivar; Tony Ortega; Larry Ramos	Birthday	3:04
4.	"Never My Love"	Don Addrisi; Dick Addrisi	Insight Out (1967)	3:08
5.	"Requiem for the Masses"	Terry Kirkman	Insight Out	4:05
6.	"Along Comes Mary"	Tandyn Almer	And Then... Along Comes the Association (1966)	2:48

Side two
No.	Title	Writer(s)	Original album	Length
1.	"Enter the Young" (re-recorded version)	Terry Kirkman	And Then... Along Comes the Association	2:43
2.	"No Fair at All"	Jim Yester	Renaissance (1966)	2:35
3.	"Time for Livin'"	Don Addrisi; Dick Addrisi	Birthday	2:44
4.	"We Love Us" (erroneously listed as "We Love")	Ted Bluechel	Insight Out	2:22
5.	"Cherish"	Terry Kirkman	And Then... Along Comes the Association	3:24
6.	"Windy"	Ruthann Friedman	Insight Out	2:53
7.	"Six Man Band"	Terry Kirkman	WB single 7229	2:11
Total length:				37:30

Track information and credits verified from the album's liner notes.

== Charts ==
Chart (1968–1969)	Peak position
Canada Top Albums/CDs (RPM)	2
US Billboard 200	4

== Certifications ==
Region	Certification	Certified units/sales
Canada (Music Canada)	Gold	50,000^{^}
United States (RIAA)	2× Platinum	2,000,000^{^}
^{^} Shipments figures based on certification alone.
