= Les Rallizes Dénudés =

Japanese rock band (1967–1996)

- Les Rallizes Dénudés c. 1972–75. From left to right: Takeshi Nakamura, Takashi Mizutani, Mikio Nagata, and Shunichiro Shoda.

Background information
- Origin: Kyoto, Japan
- Genres: Psychedelic rock; noise rock
- Years active: 1967–1988; 1993–1996
- Labels: Rivista; Temporal Drift; Tuff Beats
- Website: lesrallizesdenudes-official.com

Les Rallizes Dénudés (裸のラリーズ, Hadaka no rariizu) were a Japanese rock band formed in Kyoto in 1967.

== History ==
=== 1967–1996 ===
Les Rallizes Dénudés was formed at Doshisha University in Kyoto, Japan in November 1967, with an initial lineup that comprised Takashi Mizutani, Takeshi Nakamura, and Moriaki Wakabayashi. They were joined by Takashi Kato shortly after, and the band began performing concerts in 1968. The band's members became increasingly involved with student politics, and Wakabayashi left the band in mid-1968 to join the Red Army Faction. Mizutani met fellow student Makoto Kubota and invited him to join the band in 1969, soon after which Mizutani briefly disbanded the band. The two recorded psychedelic folk songs at a university studio in February 1970 during the band's hiatus, and performed together at Doshisha's student hall early that year.

After rejoining the band in 1971, Kubota continued playing with Les Rallizes Dénudés until the end of 1973, and quit after his band Sunset Gang became busy. The band appeared on the Oz Days Live compilation album that year, released to commemorate Oz's closure. In 1976, journalist Aida Akira produced studio recordings by Les Rallizes Dénudés at the Big Box studio in Tokyo; despite Mizutani's displeasure with the production, he allowed Akira to present the demos to Virgin Records, though a deal was never struck as Virgin prioritized signing the Sex Pistols.

The band released three albums during Mizutani's lifetime: '67-'69 Studio et Live, '77 Live, and Mizutani/Les Rallizes Dénudés. The three albums were made simultaneously available on CD on August 15, 1991. '67-'69 Studio et Live contained the band's earliest recordings, '77 Live included the band's concert in Tachikawa on March 12, 1977, and Mizutani/Les Rallizes Dénudés was made up of Mizutani and Kubota's recorded songs, as well as live performances from 1970 and 1973. A fourth unreleased album was planned by Mizutani in 1991, described as "a mix of live, rehearsal and rare studio recordings", including recordings from the Virgin demo. Two more releases followed: a VHS concert film in 1992, and a 7-inch vinyl single in 1996. The band played their final concert at Club Citta in Kawasaki, Kanagawa on October 4, 1996.

=== 1997–2019: Post-disbandment ===
Julian Cope's 2007 book Japrocksampler contained a chapter about Les Rallizes Dénudés, whose account of the band was retrospectively described as "highly sensationalised and speculative" by The Guardian.

Kubota traveled to New York in 2019 to help produce and film a documentary about his friend, folk musician Sachiko Kanenobu, and was surprised to discover that many of those attending knew him, and asked questions about Les Rallizes Dénudés. Between August to September of the year, Kubota continued speaking to Mizutani by telephone, planning to reunite and discussing the idea of reissuing the band's music. Mizutani further proposed the idea of a "last tour". Soon afterwards, Kubota stopped hearing back, and Mizutani's partner eventually reached out to Kubota to inform him Mizutani had died that December, at age 71.

=== 2020–present: Reissue campaign ===
On October 21, 2021, the official Les Rallizes Dénudés website was launched, publicly announcing Mizutani's death. Kubota, who registered the website, held an interview with The Quietus on November 5, where he discussed an upcoming December announcement and remastering the Rivista CDs. The band's first official digital release, the song "White Awakening", was released on December 11, released as part of the Oz Days Live: '72-'73 Kichijoji - 50th Anniversary Collection album. A standalone version of the Oz recordings by Les Rallizes Dénudés was released as The Oz Tapes by Temporal Drift in 2022.

Temporal Drift announced in September 2022 that the three 1991 albums would be remastered by Kubota and reissued on CD and vinyl, with their release slated for November 25. Two Les Rallizes Dénudés concerts from 1993 were re-released in 2023, "Citta '93" and "Baus '93", with the latter including a DVD of the performance and an essay by Cope. More concert re-releases followed through 2024 and 2025, including 屋根裏 YaneUra Oct. '80, 屋根裏 YaneUra Sept. '80, and Jittoku '76. Mizutani's fourth planned album from 1991, which he referred to as "Disque 4", was reassembled by Kubota from Mizutani's archived reel-to-reel tapes and tracklists, and was released as Disque 4 -'76 Studio et Live- on May 8, 2026.

== Members ==
- Takashi Mizutani – vocals, guitar, occasional keyboards (1967–1988, 1993–1996)
- Takeshi Nakamura – guitar, bass (1967–1969, 1972–1977)
- Moriaki Wakabayashi – bass (1967–1968)
- Takashi Katoh – drums, percussion (1967–1969)
- Takashi Tada – bass, guitar (1969)
- Masaronni Konno – woodwinds (1969)
- Tsutomi Matsumoto – drums (1969)
- Makoto Kubota – guitar, bass, percussion (1970–1973)
- Tadanaka Makino – percussion (1970)
- Mikio Nagata – bass (1970–1975)
- Shunichiro Shoda – drums (1970–1975)
- Shime Takahashi – drums (1975)
- Hiroshi Nar – bass (1975–1978, 1995)
- Toshiro Mimaki ("Sami") – drums, bass, guitar (1976–1979, 1985, 1993)
- Kodo Noma – drums (1978–1985, 1987–1988, 1993–1996)
- Takada Kyohiro ("Doronco") – bass (1979–1983, 1985–1988, 1993)
- Fujio Yamaguchi – guitar (1970, 1980–1981)
- Akira Fujii – saxophone, guitar (1981–1985)
- Masaru Oiwa – bass (1983–1984)
- Yokai Takahashi – bass (1984–1985, 1987, 1993–1995)
- Kouji Kido – drums (1985–1986)
- Yoshio Kuge – drums (1986–1987)
- Katsuhiko Ishii – guitar (1987, 1993–1994)
- Maki Miura – guitar (1994–1995)
- Kyoko Okumi – bass (1996)

== Discography ==
=== Original albums ===
- '67-'69 Studio et Live (1991)
- '77 Live (1991)
- Mizutani/Les Rallizes Dénudés (1991)

=== Reissue albums ===
- The OZ Tapes (2022)
- Citta' '93 (2023)
- Baus '93 (2023)
- 屋根裏 YaneUra Oct. '80 (2024)
- 屋根裏 YaneUra Sept. '80 (2025)
- Jittoku '76 (2025)
- Disque 4 -'76 Studio et Live- (2026)

=== Unofficial releases ===
Reportedly starting around the late 1980s, bootleg recordings of Les Rallizes Dénudés concerts have been released by tapers, with the estimated amount ranging from dozens to hundreds. NPR remarked these physical releases garnered new interest "materializing as MP3 uploads on music blogs in the 2000s", with Mizutani disavowing the bootlegs, having desired to put a stop to illegally released physical and digital albums. Notable bootlegs include Heavier Than a Death in the Family, Blind Baby Has It's Mother's Eyes, and Great White Wonder.
