= The Christians (band) =

British musical ensemble

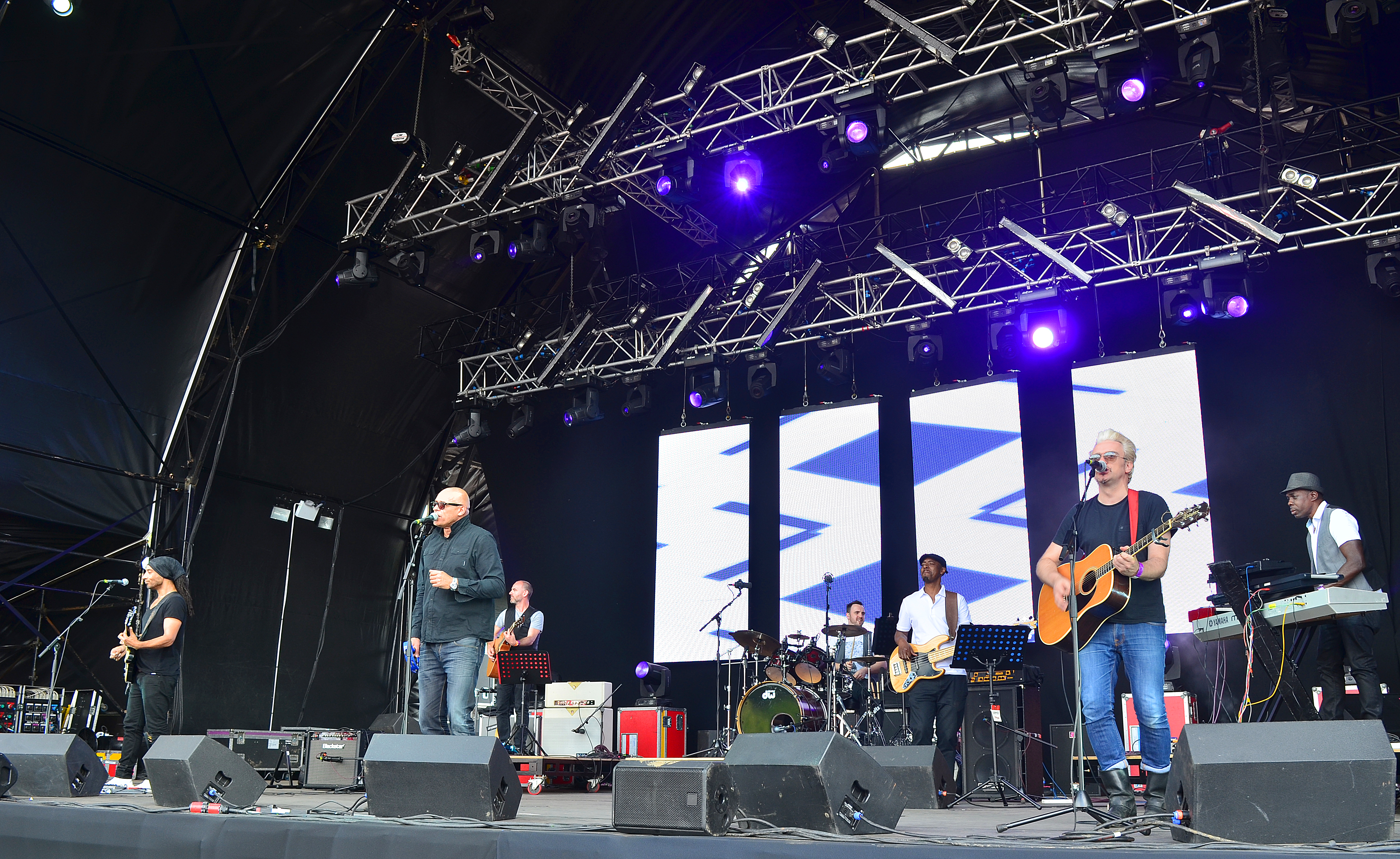
- The Christians performing in 2014

Background information
- Origin: Liverpool, England
- Genres: Soul, sophisti-pop, a cappella (early)
- Years active: 1985–present
- Labels: Island, Cherry Red
- Members: Garry Christian; Joey Ankrah; Neil Griffiths; Lionel Duke; Bobby Kewley; Mike Triggs
- Past members: Alun Jones; Henry Priestman; Russell Christian; Paul Barlow; Mike Bulger; Roger Christian (deceased); Tony Jones; Stewart Boyle; Paul Campbell; Craig Connet; Cliff Watson
- Website: Official website

The Christians are a musical ensemble from Liverpool, England. They had the highest selling debut album of any artist at Island Records and achieved international chart hits in the late 1980s and early 1990s.

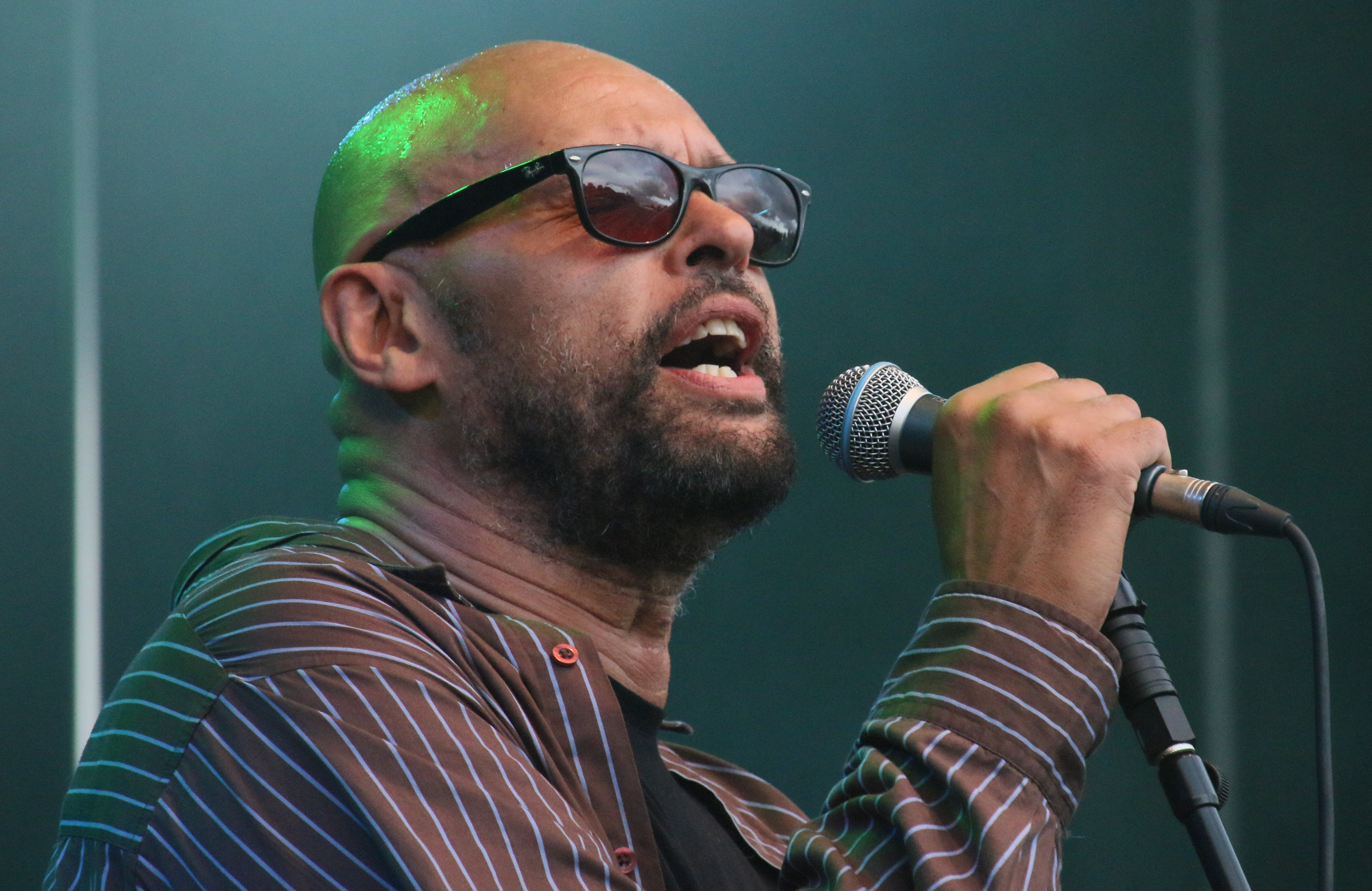
Garry Christian at the Shrewsbury Flower Show 2016

== Band biography ==
The name of the band is the surname of the three brothers who were originally in the line-up, and guitarist Henry Priestman's middle name.

The band was formed in Liverpool in 1985 by brothers Garry (lead vocals), Roger (vocals, instrumentalist), and Russell (keyboards, saxophone, vocals), together with Henry Priestman (keyboards, guitars, vocals). Paul Barlow (drums), Mike Bulger (guitar/vocals) and Tony Jones on bass were also early members. Because of a reluctance to tour, Roger left in 1987 to record a solo album.

In Rock: The Rough Guide, critic Charles Bottomley, described them as "The Temptations in ripped jeans, producing gritty-centred songs in a sugary vocal shell".

=== Chart history ===
Their first five singles all made the top 40 in Britain, and their debut album The Christians (1987) entered the UK Albums Chart at number 2. It eventually sold over a million copies. The highest-placed single from this album was "Ideal World", which reached number 14 in the UK Singles Chart.

In 1988, they released a cover of The Isley Brothers' "Harvest for the World", with all proceeds going to charity. The video for the track was an animation, created by four leading animation companies, including Aardman Animations. The video won several awards, and the single reached number 8 in the UK singles chart, their sixth consecutive British top 40 hit.

1989 saw another charity single success, this time as performers on a version of "Ferry Cross the Mersey", released in aid of those affected by the Hillsborough disaster. The single spent three weeks at number one in the UK charts.

Their second album, Colour, released in 1990, reached number one in the UK Albums Chart and the top 20 in several other countries; it yielded the international hit "Words", based on the Irish traditional "Women Of Ireland", which was No. 18 in the UK (including the Hillsborough charity single, their eighth consecutive UK top 40 hit) and Sweden, No. 5 in the Netherlands (for two weeks), and No. 1 in France (also for two weeks). The second single from the album, "I Found Out", reached No. 22 in France (No. 56 in the UK).

In 1992, the following LP, Happy in Hell, charted at number 18. Two songs from the album reached the UK top 40, "What's in a Word" (the first single), which also was a top 20 hit in France (with a total chart run of 19 weeks) and entered the top 40 in the Netherlands and the German top 75, reaching No. 60, and "The Bottle", a cover of the Gil Scott-Heron/Brian Jackson song.

The early 1990s saw the band continuing to tour. A greatest hits album, The Best of The Christians, was released in 1993, and peaked at number 22.

=== Break up and reformation ===
Garry Christian moved to Paris in 1995 to record a solo album, Your Cool Mystery, effectively breaking up the band, although no formal announcement was made, and the door was open to future reformation. In 1998 founding member Roger Christian died from a brain tumour. In 1997 The Christians began to perform together again in an "unplugged" acoustic format. They carried out a thirty-six date tour of the UK, with a similar tour undertaken in 2000, with guitarist and songwriter Paul Campbell, who accompanied them on all of their tours until 2003.

By 2001, The Christians began to write songs for Prodigal Sons, which was released in 2003. This was supported by a UK tour in October 2003, and further promotion in France, Spain and UK throughout 2004.

In 2005, Russell Christian decided he no longer wished to tour, and a decision was made to return to a full band format, rather than the four-man "unplugged" line-up that had been touring since 1999. This new "band" comprising Garry Christian (lead vocals), Joey Ankrah (singer, guitar), Neil Griffiths (singer and acoustic guitar), Cliff Watson (bass guitar), Lionel Duke (drums), Mike Triggs (keyboards) was unveiled on the 2009 tour. A download single (released on download on 5 March 2010) was a cover of Cat Stevens' "Where Do the Children Play?"

2012 was the 25th anniversary for the band, who celebrated with a re-release of The Christians and Colour. A new album called Speed of Life was released in September, with the title track the first single. In August they embarked on a tour of the UK and, on 16 December, they played at Liverpool's Royal Court Theatre. They were briefly joined on stage by former band member Henry Priestman.

Between September 2013 and January 2014, the Christians toured with Go West and Hue & Cry on a 32 date tour of the UK. A single, "Inner City Blues", was released in September 2013.

In December 2021, the band released a version of their hit "Man Don't Cry", renaming it "Naz Don't Cry" in reference to the plight of Nazanin Zaghari-Ratcliffe, an Iranian-British dual citizen who was detained in Iran from 3 April 2016 to 16 March 2022 on charges of espionage for the British government. The video for the single features her daughter with Richard Ratcliffe, Gabriella.

The band's drummer, Lionel Duke, suffered a cardiac arrest whilst performing on stage with the band at the On The Waterfront festival in Liverpool in June 2025. Duke was placed into an induced coma, and subsequently made a "miracle" recovery.

== Discography ==
=== Studio albums ===
| Year | Album | Peak chart positions | | Certifications |
| Year | Album | UK | AUS | Certifications |
|---|---|---|---|---|
| 1987 | The Christians | 2 | 64 | BPI: 3× Platinum |
| 1990 | Colour | 1 | 138 | BPI: Platinum |
| 1992 | Happy in Hell | 18 | 143 | |
| 2003 | Prodigal Sons | ― | ― | |
| 2009 | Soul from Liverpool | ― | ― | |
| 2012 | Speed of Life | ― | ― | |
| 2012 | The Christians (Deluxe 25th anniversary re-release) | ― | ― | |
| 2012 | Colour (Deluxe 25th anniversary re-release) | ― | ― | |
| 2015 | We | ― | ― | |
"—" denotes releases that did not chart or were not released.

=== Compilation albums ===
| Year | Album | UK | Certifications |
|---|---|---|---|
| 1993 | The Best of The Christians | 22 | BPI: Gold |
| 2017 | Sings & Strings: Greatest Hits Reimagined | — | |
"—" denotes releases that did not chart.

=== Singles ===
| Year | Single | Peak positions | | | | | | | | | | Album |
| Year | Single | UK | AUS | IRE | NED | BEL (FLA) | FRA | GER | SWE | NZ | US Dance | Album |
|---|---|---|---|---|---|---|---|---|---|---|---|---|
| 1987 | "Forgotten Town" | 22 | — | — | 63 | — | — | 31 | — | — | — | The Christians |
| 1987 | "Hooverville (And They Promised Us the World)" | 21 | — | 18 | — | — | — | — | — | — | — | The Christians |
| 1987 | "When the Fingers Point" | 34 | 73 | — | — | — | — | — | — | 49 | 29 | The Christians |
| 1987 | "Ideal World" | 14 | 89 | 11 | 20 | 35 | — | — | — | — | — | The Christians |
| 1988 | "Born Again" | 25 | — | 27 | 61 | 35 | — | — | — | — | — | The Christians |
| 1988 | "Harvest for the World" (charity single) | 8 | 162 | 4 | 28 | 32 | — | — | — | — | — | Singles only |
| 1989 | "Ferry Cross the Mersey" (charity single with other artists) | 1 | 45 | 1 | 21 | 28 | — | 5 | — | — | — | Singles only |
| 1989 | "Words" | 18 | 152 | 6 | 5 | 10 | 1 | — | 18 | — | — | Colour |
| 1990 | "I Found Out" | 56 | 140 | — | 69 | 42 | 22 | — | — | — | — | Colour |
| 1990 | "Greenbank Drive" | 63 | — | — | — | — | — | — | — | — | — | Colour |
| 1992 | "What's in a Word" | 33 | 193 | — | 38 | — | 17 | 60 | — | — | — | Happy in Hell |
| 1992 | "Father" | 55 | — | — | 82 | — | 49 | — | — | — | — | Happy in Hell |
| 1993 | "The Bottle" | 39 | — | — | — | — | — | 86 | — | — | — | Happy in Hell |
| 1993 | "The Perfect Moment" | 76 | — | — | — | — | — | — | — | — | — | The Best Of |
"—" denotes releases that did not chart or were not released.
