= The Christians (album) =

Studio album by The Christians
- Released: October 1987
- Studio: The Workhouse Studio and Parfett Sound, London, and Amazon Studios, Liverpool
- Length: 57:45
- Label: Island
- Producer: Laurie Latham

The Christians chronology
The Christians (1987)	Colour (1990)

Singles from The Christians
- 1. "Forgotten Town" Released: January 1987; 2. "Hooverville (They Promised Us the World)" Released: June 1987; 3. "When the Fingers Point" Released: September 1987; 4. "Ideal World" Released: November 1987; 5. "Born Again" Released: April 1988

The Christians is the debut album by English music ensemble the Christians, released in 1987. It contains their first five UK hit singles: "Forgotten Town", "Hooverville", "When the Fingers Point", "Ideal World" and "Born Again".

== Critical reception ==
Professional ratings
Review scores
Source	Rating
AllMusic	3/5 stars
Smash Hits	8/10

AllMusic has retrospectively been generally favourable towards the album, stating that the band "blend socially conscious lyrics of life under Thatcher with smooth, slickly programmed pop-soul arrangements" and concluding that the record was "a solid debut with very few filler tracks".

== Track listing ==
All tracks written and composed by Henry Priestman except where noted.

1. "Forgotten Town" – 5:13
2. "When the Fingers Point" – 3:32
3. "Born Again" – 5:18
4. "Ideal World" (Priestman, M. Henry Herman) – 4:35
5. "Save a Soul in Every Town" – 4:32
6. "...And That's Why" – 5:17
7. "Hooverville" (Priestman, Herman) – 4:45
8. "One in a Million" – 4:42
9. "Sad Songs" (Priestman, Herman) – 4:25
10. "Forgotten Town" (12" dub version) – 5:26 (bonus track on cassette and CD)
11. "When the Fingers Point" (12" remix) – 5:32 (bonus track on cassette and CD)
12. "Why Waltz" – 4:07 (bonus track on cassette and CD)
- On the cassette version of the album, the 12" Dub Version of "Forgotten Town" was placed at the end of side one, after "Save a Soul in Every Town".

== Personnel ==
The Christians:

- Garry A. Christian – lead vocals
- Russell Christian – saxophone, vocals
- Henry Priestman – keyboards, guitar, vocals

Additional personnel:

- Mike Bulger – electric guitar
- Tony Jones – bass
- Paul Barlow – drums
- Anthony Moore – programming
- Produced & engineered by Laurie Latham
- Additional engineering by Pete Coleman, Stuart Barry
- Mastered by Tim Young
- Mix on track 4 – David Bascombe
- Mix on track 7 – Pete Hammond

== Charts ==
=== Weekly charts ===
Chart (1987)	Peak position
Australia (Kent Music Report)	64
Dutch Albums (Album Top 100)	16
Finnish Albums (Suomen virallinen lista)	34
New Zealand Albums (RMNZ)	19
UK Albums (OCC)	2
US Billboard 200	158

=== Year-end charts ===
Chart (1987)	Position
UK Albums (OCC)	65
