= Greatest Hits Live (Roy Orbison album) =

Live album by Roy Orbison
- Released: 2006
- Recorded: 9 May 1969 – 30 September 1987
- Genre: Rock
- Length: 27:46
- Label: Sony/Legacy
- Producer: Barbara Orbison

Roy Orbison chronology
| King of Hearts (1992) | Greatest Hits Live (Roy Orbison album) (2006) |

Greatest Hits Live is a posthumous compilation album of live recordings made during Roy Orbison's career. It was released in 2006 by Legacy Recordings. It sampled two previous releases; Roy Orbison: Authorized Bootleg Collection and Black & White Night; as well as providing two exclusive tracks.

== Track listing ==
1. "Only The Lonely"
  - From "Roy Orbison: Authorized Bootleg Collection"
  - Recorded 13 July 1980, Birmingham, Alabama
2. "Ooby Dooby"
  - From "Roy Orbison: Authorized Bootleg Collection"
  - Recorded 18 October 1975, Queen's Theatre, Hornchurch
3. "Mean Woman Blues"
  - From "Roy Orbison: Authorized Bootleg Collection"
  - Recorded 18 October 1975, Queen's Theatre, Hornchurch
4. "Running Scared"
  - Previously unreleased
  - Recorded early 1980s
5. "Blue Bayou"
  - From "Roy Orbison: Authorized Bootleg Collection"
  - Recorded 9 May 1969, Batley Variety Club
6. "In Dreams"
  - From "Roy Orbison: Authorized Bootleg Collection"
  - Recorded 9 May 1969, Batley Variety Club
7. "Crying"
  - From single "Wild Hearts (...time)" - previously unreleased on CD
8. "Oh, Pretty Woman"
  - From "Black & White Night"
  - Recorded 30 September 1987
