= Live (Trouble Funk album) =

Live album by Trouble Funk
- Released: 1981
- Genre: Go-go; funk; old-school hip hop
- Length: 57:54
- Label: Jamtu Records; TF Records
- Producer: Trouble Funk

Trouble Funk chronology
Live (1981)	Drop the Bomb (1982)

Professional ratings
Review scores
Source	Rating
AllMusic	4.5/5 stars
ARTISTdirect	4.5/5 stars
Robert Christgau	A−
musicHound R&B	(5/5)
The Rolling Stone Album Guide	4/5 stars
Washington City Paper	(favorable)

Live (also titled as Straight Up Funk Go Go Style) is a live album recorded and released in 1981 by the Washington, D.C.–based go-go band Trouble Funk. This was the group's debut album, and consist of four approximately 15-minute jam sessions. The album was remastered and reissued in 1996.

== Track listing ==
1. "Part A" – 14:02
2. "Part B" – 13:42
3. "Part C" – 14:56
4. "Part D" – 15:14

== Personnel ==
- Chester "T-Bone" Davis – electric guitar
- Tony Fisher – lead vocals, bass guitar
- Emmett Nixon – drums
- James Avery – keyboards
- Robert Reed – keyboards
- Mack Carey – percussions, congas
- Timothy David – percussions, congas
- David Rudd – saxophone
- Gerald Reed – trombone
- Taylor Reed – trombone, trumpet
