= Greatest =

Greatest may refer to:

- Greatest!, a 1959 album by Johnny Cash
- Bee Gees Greatest, a 1979 album by Bee Gees
- Greatest (The Go-Go's album), 1990
- Greatest (Duran Duran album), 1998
- Greatest (Raspberries album), 2005
- Greatest (song), a song by Eminem
- "Greatest", a song by NEFFEX
- "Greatest", a song by Otonose Kanade
- Greatist, a fitness and health website

== See also ==
- Greatness, a concept of superiority
- The Greatest (disambiguation)
