= Live on Stage =

Live on Stage may refer to:

- Live on Stage (New Riders of the Purple Sage album), 1993
- Live on Stage (Chuck Berry album), 2000
- Live on Stage (Monsieur Camembert album), 2001
