= Greatest Hits Volume 2 (Hank Williams Jr. album) =

Greatest hits album by Hank Williams Jr.
- Released: 1972
- Genre: Country
- Length: 27:47
- Label: MGM

Hank Williams Jr.'s Greatest Hits – Volume 2 is an album by American country music singer and songwriter Hank Williams Jr. The Album was issued by MGM Records as number SE 4822.

== Track listing ==
=== Side one ===
1. Rainin' in My Heart – 2:56 (James Moore/Jerry West)
2. After All They All Used To Belong To Me. Sung with the Mike Curb Congregation – 2:28
3. So Sad (To Watch Good Love Go Bad). Sung with Lois Johnson – 2:50
4. A-eee – 2:50
5. Ain't That A Shame. Sung with the Mike Curb Congregation – 2:18

=== Side two ===
1. All For the Love of Sunshine. Sung with the Mike Curb Congregation – 3:52
2. I've Learned to Take the Hurtin' – 2:32
3. Removing the Shadow. Sung with Lois Johnson – 2:58
4. I Walked Out On Heaven – 2:32
5. I've Got A Right to Cry – 2:31
