= Colour (The Christians album) =

Studio album by The Christians
- Released: January 1990
- Recorded: 1989
- Studio: La Fontaine, Guernsey and Amazon Studios, Liverpool
- Label: Island
- Producer: Laurie Latham

The Christians chronology
The Christians (1987)	Colour (1990)	Happy in Hell (1992)

Singles from Colour
- 1. "Words" Released: December 1989; 2. "I Found Out" Released: April 1990; 3. "Greenbank Drive" Released: September 1990

Colour is the second album by British soul group the Christians. It was released in January 1990 by Island Records and peaked at number one on the UK Albums Chart. It also reached the top 20 in several European countries due to, notably, the success of its lead single "Words".

== Critical reception ==
A review in Music & Media said "Colour is a triumph... A rich textured sound and instantly recognisable vocal harmonies combine with a strong, well thought out bunch of songs".

== Track listing ==
All songs written and composed by Henry Priestman except where noted.

1. "Man Don't Cry" – 4:45
2. "I Found Out" – 4:30
3. "Greenbank Drive" – 4:24
4. "All Talk" – 4:38
5. "Words" (music: traditional, arranged Priestman, lyrics: Priestman) – 7:04
6. "Community of Spirit" (Garry Christian) – 5:13
7. "There You Go Again" – 6:01
8. "One More Baby in Black" – 5:39
9. "In My Hour of Need" – 6:23

=== 2012 reissue bonus tracks ===
10. "Long Gone" (Christian) – 3:20
11. "Funny Money" – 3:35
12. "Save Us from Our Friends" – 3:46
13. "Sent Here to Shine" – 4:29
14. "Greenback Drive" (Laurie Latham remix) – 4:28
15. "From the Water's Edge" – 3:24
16. "Greenback Drive" (Nomad Soul 7") – 4:45

== Personnel ==
The Christians:

- Garry A. Christian – lead vocals
- Russell Christian – saxophone, vocals
- Henry Priestman – keyboards, guitar, vocals
- Steve Ferrone – drums
- Manu Katche – drums
- Pino Palladino – Fretless Bass

Additional personnel:

- The London Community Gospel Choir – choir on "In My Hour of Need"

== Charts ==
Chart performance
Chart (1990)	Peak position
Australian Albums (ARIA)	138
Austrian Albums (Ö3 Austria)	30
Dutch Albums (Album Top 100)	7
Finnish Albums (Suomen virallinen lista)	28
French Albums (SNEP)	4
German Albums (Offizielle Top 100)	23
Irish Albums (IRMA)	2
New Zealand Albums (RMNZ)	28
Norwegian Albums (VG-lista)	18
Spanish Albums (AFYVE)	3
Swedish Albums (Sverigetopplistan)	8
Swiss Albums (Schweizer Hitparade)	13
UK Albums (OCC)	1

== Certifications ==
Certifications
Region	Certification	Certified units/sales
France (SNEP)	Gold	100,000^{*}
Spain (Promusicae)	Platinum	100,000^{^}
Sweden (GLF)	Gold	50,000^{^}
United Kingdom (BPI)	Platinum	300,000^{^}
^{*} Sales figures based on certification alone.^{^} Shipments figures based on certification alone.
