= Drop the Bomb =

Studio album by Trouble Funk
- Released: 1982
- Genre: Go-go; old-school hip hop; funk
- Length: 36:43
- Label: Sugar Hill Records
- Producer: Reo Edwards(exec)

Trouble Funk chronology
Live (1981)	Drop the Bomb (1982)	In Times of Trouble (1983)

Professional ratings
Review scores
Source	Rating
AllMusic	4.5/5 stars
ARTISTdirect	4.5/5 stars
Robert Christgau	A−
musicHound R&B	4.5/5 stars
The Rolling Stone Album Guide	4/5 stars

Drop the Bomb is a studio album released in 1982 by the Washington, D.C.–based go-go band Trouble Funk. The album included the songs "Drop the Bomb" and "Pump Me Up" which have been sampled numerous times by many hip hop artists.

== Track listing ==
No.	Title	Length
1.	"Hey Fellas" (Emmett Nixon/Robert Reed/Tony Fisher)	7:18
2.	"Get On Up" (Emmett Nixon/Robert Reed)	4:50
3.	"Let's Get Hot" (Emmett Nixon/Robert Reed)	4:38
4.	"Drop the Bomb" (Chester Davis/Emmett Nixon/James Avery/Robert Reed/Taylor Reed/Timothy Davis/Tony Fisher)	6:58
5.	"Pump Me Up" (Emmett Nixon/Robert Reed/Taylor Reed/Tony Fisher)	6:34
6.	"Don't Try to Use Me" (Robert Reed/Tony Fisher)	6:15
Total length:		36:43

== Personnel ==
- Chester "T-Bone" Davis – electric guitar
- Tony Fisher – lead vocals, bass guitar
- Emmett Nixon – drums
- James Avery – keyboards
- Robert Reed – keyboards
- Mack Carey – percussion, congas
- Timothy "T-Bone" David – percussion, vocals
- David Rudd – saxophone
- Gerald Reed – trombone
- Taylor Reed – trombone, trumpet
