= Trouble Funk =

American band

- Origin: Washington D.C., U.S.
- Genres: Funk; go-go; old-school hip-hop
- Instruments: Electric guitar; bass; trombone; trumpet; saxophone; drums; keyboards
- Years active: 1978–present
- Labels: Sugar Hill; Island; Infinite Zero; American Recordings
- Members: Timothius "Tee-Bone" David; Big Tony Fisher others
- Past members: Emmett "EJ Roxx" Nixon; Mack Carey; Timothius "Tee-Bone" David; Chester "Boogie" Davis; Big Tony Fisher; James "Doc" Avery; Gerald Reed; Robert "Syke Dyke" Reed; Taylor "Monster Baby" Reed; David Rudd

Trouble Funk is an American R&B and funk band from Washington, D.C. The group helped to popularize funk and the subgenre go-go in the Washington metropolitan area. Among the band's well-known songs is the go-go anthem "Hey, Fellas". They released several studio albums including Drop the Bomb, In Times of Trouble, Live, and Trouble Over Here Trouble Over There (UK No. 54), and two live albums, Trouble Funk: Straight Up Go-Go Style and Saturday Night Live. In 1982, they released a single "So Early in the Morning" on D.E.T.T Records, later reissued on diverse labels as 2.13.61 and Tuff City. Trouble Funk sometimes shared the stage with hardcore punk bands of the day such as Minor Threat and the Big Boys.

Trouble Funk's song "Pump Me Up" was sampled by many other artists, including Dimples D.'s "Sucker DJ", which went to No. 1 in Australia, Public Enemy's "Fight the Power", Kurtis Blow's song "If I Ruled the World" and MARRS's song "Pump Up the Volume". The song is also featured in the film Style Wars and on the fictional old-school hip-hop radio station Wildstyle in the game, Grand Theft Auto: Vice City (2002).

Keyboard player Robert "Syke Dyke" Reed died at the age of 50 on April 13, 2008, from pancreatic cancer.

Trouble Funk remains active in the Washington, D.C. area live-music scene.

== Discography ==
=== Albums ===
- Live (also titled as Straight Up Funk Go Go Style) (Jamtu Records, 1981)
- Drop the Bomb (Sugar Hill, 1982)
- In Times of Trouble (D.E.T.T. Records, 1983)
- Saturday Night Live (Island Records, 1983)
- Say What! (Island, 1986)
- Trouble Over Here (Island, 1987)
- Early Singles (Infinite Zero, 1997)
- Droppin' Bombs (Harmless, 1998)
- E Flat Boogie (Funky Delicacies, 2000)
- The Complete Collection of Trouble Funk (TF Records, 2015)

=== Charted songs ===
Title	Year	Peak chart positions			Album
Title	Year	US R&B	NL	UK	Album
"E-Flat Boogie"	1980	72	—	—	Non-album single
"Hey Fellas"	1982	63	—	—	Drop the Bomb
"Trouble Funk Express"	1983	77	—	—	Non-album single
"Drop the Bomb"	1985	—	—	99	Say What?
"Still Smokin'"	1985	80	—	79	Non-album singles
"Good to Go"	1986	66	—	—	Non-album singles
"Woman of Principle"	1987	—	39	65	Trouble Over Here
"Trouble"	1987	—	—	95	Trouble Over Here
"Trouble Still Smoking"	1987	—	—	99	Non-album single
"—" denotes a song that did not chart or was not released in that region.
