= Chuck Brown discography =

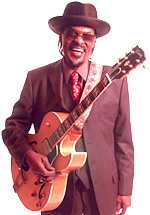
- Studio albums: 12
- Live albums: 6
- Singles: 25

This is a discography documenting albums, music, and music videos released by American go-go musician Chuck Brown.

== Albums ==
=== Studio albums ===
List of studio albums, with selected chart positions and certifications
Title	Album details	Peak chart positions			Certifications (sales threshold)
Title	Album details	US	US Indie	Hot R&B	Certifications (sales threshold)
We the People (with The Soul Searchers)	Released: 1972 (US); Label: Sussex Records; Format: LP	—	—	—	
Salt of the Earth (with The Soul Searchers)	Released: 1974 (US); Label: Sussex Records; Format: LP, cassette	—	—	—	
Bustin' Loose (with The Soul Searchers)	Released: 1979 (US); label: Source Records; Format: LP, cassette	31	—	5	RIAA: Gold
Funk Express (with The Soul Searchers)	Released: 1980 (US); Label: Source Records; Format: LP, cassette	—	—	—	
Hah Man	Released: 1994 (US); Label: Raw Venture; Format: CD, LP, cassette	—	—	—	
Timeless (with The Second Chapter Band)	Released: April 7, 1998 (US); Label: Raw Venture; Format: CD, LP, cassette	—	—	—	
The Spirit of Christmas	Released: 1999 (US); Label: Raw Venture; Format: CD, LP, cassette	—	—	—	
We're About the Business	Released: April 24, 2007 (US); Label: Raw Venture; Format: CD, digital download	37	1	2	
We Got This	Released: September 21, 2010 (US); Label: Raw Venture; Format: CD, digital download	142	18	23	
Beautiful Life	Released: August 19, 2014 (US); Label: Raw Venture; Format: CD, digital download	140	19	20	
"—" denotes a recording that did not chart.

=== Live albums ===
List of live albums, with selected chart positions
Title	Album details	Peak chart positions		
Title	Album details	US	US Indie	Hot R&B
Go Go Swing Live (with The Soul Searchers)	Released: 1986 (US); Label: Future Sound Records; Format: LP, cassette	—	—	—
Any Other Way to Go? (with The Soul Searchers)	Released: 1987 (US); Label: Rhythm Attack Production; Format: LP, cassette	—	—	—
Live '87 – D.C. Bumpin' Y'all (with The Soul Searchers)	Released: 1987 (US); Label: Rhythm King Records; Format: LP, cassette	—	—	—
This Is a Journey...Into Time (with The Soul Searchers)	Released: 1993 (US); Label: Raw Venture; Format: LP, CD, cassette	—	—	—
Your Game...Live at the 9:30 Club	Released: 2001 (US); Label: Raw Venture; Format: LP, CD	193	10	56
Put Your Hands Up!	Released: 2002 (US); Label: Raw Venture; Format: LP, CD	—	—	—
"—" denotes a recording that did not chart.

=== Compilation albums ===
List of compilation albums, with selected chart positions
Title	Album details	Peak chart positions	
Title	Album details	US Indie	Hot R&B
Go-Go Crankin'	Released: 1985 (US); Label: 4th & B'way, Island, T.T.E.D.; Format: LP, cassette	—	—
Greatest Hits	Released: 1998 (US); Label: Raw Venture; Format: CD, LP, cassette	—	—
Best of Chuck Brown	Released: April 12, 2005 (US); Label: Raw Venture; Format: CD, LP	42	46
Blow Your Whistle: Original Old School Breaks & Classic Funk Bombs (with The Soul Searcher)	Released: February 19, 2007 (US); Label: Vampisoul; Format: CD, LP	—	—
"—" denotes a recording that did not chart or was not released in that territory.

=== Collaborative albums ===
List of collaborative albums
Title	Album details
Go Go Live at the Capital Centre	Released: 1987 (US); Label: I Hear Ya! Records; Format: LP, Cassette
The Go Go Posse	Released: 1988 (US); Label: I Hear Ya! Records; Format: LP, Cassette
90's Goin' Hard (with Ivan Goff)	Released: 1991 (US); Label: Goff Records; Format: LP, Cassette
The Other Side (with Eva Cassidy)	Released: 1992 (US); Label: Liaison; Format: CD, LP, Digital download
Let's Go Go Christmas	Released: 1995 (US); Label: Liaison Records; Format: LP, Cassette
Go-Go & Gumbo, Satchmo N Soul	Released: October 21, 1997 (US); Label: Mapleshade Records; Format: LP, Cassette

=== Soundtrack albums ===
List of soundtrack albums
Title	Album details
Good to Go: Original Motion Picture Soundtrack	Released: August 1, 1986; Label: 4th & B'way, Island; Format: LP, cassette
The Blue Iguana: Original Motion Picture Soundtrack	Released: April 22, 1988; Label: Polydor Records; Format: LP, cassette

== Singles ==
=== As lead artist ===
List of singles, with selected chart positions, year released, and album name
Year	Title	Peak chart positions		Album
Year	Title	US R&B	US	Album
1972	"We the People"	40	—	We the People
1973	"Think"	43	—	We the People
1974	"Ashley's Roachclip"	—	—	Salt of the Earth
1974	"Blow Your Whistle"	31	—	Salt of the Earth
1974	"If It Ain't Funky"	74	—	Salt of the Earth
1979	"Bustin' Loose"	1	34	Bustin' Loose
1979	"Never Gonna Give You Up"	—	—	Bustin' Loose
1979	"Game Seven"	81	—	Bustin' Loose
1980	"Sticks and Stones"	55	—	Funk Express
1980	"Come On and Boogie"	—	—	Funk Express
1984	"We Need Some Money"	26	—	Non-album singles
1985	"Sho Yuh Right (Back-It On Up)"	—	—	Non-album singles
1986	"Moody's Mood"	—	—	Go Go Swing Live
1986	"Stormy Monday"	—	—	Go Go Swing Live
1986	"Run Joe"	—	—	Go Go Swing Live
1986	"Family Affair"	—	—	Go Go Swing Live
1986	"Day-O"	—	—	Go Go Swing Live
1988	"That'll Work (2001)"	—	—	Non-album single
1994	"Hah Man"	—	—	Hah Man
2007	"Block Party" (featuring DJ Kool)	19	—	We're About the Business
2007	"The Party Roll"	39	—	We're About the Business
2010	"LOVE" (featuring Jill Scott and Marcus Miller)	39	—	We Got This
2010	"Chuck Baby" (featuring K.K.)	—	—	We Got This
2014	"Beautiful Life" (featuring Wale)	—	—	Beautiful Life
2014	"LIGHTERS" (featuring Ms. Yendy and Kanja)	—	—	Beautiful Life
"—" denotes a recording that did not chart.

== Music videos ==
List of music videos
Year	Title	Director(s)
2007	"Block Party"	Thomas Forbes
2007	"The Party Roll" (featuring DJ Kool)	Thomas Forbes
2014	"Beautiful Life" (featuring Wale)	
2014	"LIGHTERS" (featuring Ms. Yendy and Kanja)	
