= Best of Chuck Brown =

Greatest hits album by Chuck Brown
- Released: April 12, 2005
- Genre: Go-go; swing; soul; jazz; hip hop
- Length: 95:14
- Label: Raw Venture Records
- Producer: Reo Edwards (exec.); Stephen Meyner (exec.)

Chuck Brown chronology
Put Your Hands Up! (2002)	Best of Chuck Brown (2005)	We're About the Business (2007)

Professional ratings
Review scores
Source	Rating
AllMusic	4/5 stars
ARTISTdirect	3.5/5 stars

Best of Chuck Brown is a career-spanning greatest hits album by Washington, D.C.–based go-go musician and recording artist Chuck Brown. The double album was released on April 12, 2005, and consist of a compilation of sixteen digitally remastered songs from his previously released studio and live albums, including "Back It On Up (Sho' Ya Right)", "Run Joe", "Bustin' Loose", and "We Need Some Money".

== Track listing ==
Disc: 1
No.	Title	Writer(s)	Length
1.	"We the People"	Chuck Brown	5:25
2.	"Blow Your Whistle"	Maxx Kidd; Chuck Brown	3:02
3.	"Bustin' Loose"	Chuck Brown	7:41
4.	"Back It on Up (Sho' Ya Right)"	Chuck Brown	9:29
5.	"We Need Some Money"	Chuck Brown; Curtis Johnson	8:16
6.	"Day-O"	Irving Burgie; William Attaway	7:06
7.	"Misty"	Erroll Garner	6:05
8.	"Fiesta"	R. Kelly	4:35

Disc: 2
No.	Title	Writer(s)	Length
1.	"It Don't Mean a Thing (If It Ain't Got That Swing)"	Duke Ellington; Irving Mills	3:14
2.	"Midnight Sun"	Sonny Burke; Lionel Hampton; Johnny Mercer	3:24
3.	"Moody's Mood"	Dorothy Fields; Jimmy McHugh; James Moody	5:07
4.	"Woody Woodpecker"	Louis Jordan; Joe Willoughby	2:35
5.	"Stormy Monday"	T-Bone Walker	5:46
6.	"Run Joe"	Louis Jordan; Joe Willoughby	8:55
7.	"Playing Your Game, Baby"	Austin Croom Johnson	6:38
8.	"Can't Nobody Do Me Like Jesus"	Andraé Crouch	7:56
Total length:			95:14

== Personnel ==
- Chuck Brown – lead vocals, electric guitar
- John M. Buchannan – keyboards, trombone
- Leroy Fleming – tenor saxophone, background vocals
- Curtis Johnson – keyboards
- Donald Tillery – trumpet, background vocals
- Ricardo D. Wellman – drums
- Rowland Smith – congas, background vocals
- Glenn Ellis – bass guitar, percussion
- Reo Edwards – executive producer, audio mixing
- Stephan Meyner – executive producer
