= Put Your Hands Up! =

Live album by Chuck Brown
- Released: August 20, 2002
- Venue: The 9:30 Club; Washington, D.C.
- Genre: Go-go; neo soul; R&B; hip hop
- Length: 1:57:34
- Label: Raw Venture; Liaison
- Producer: Tom Goldfogle (exec); Becky Marcus

Chuck Brown chronology
Your Game...Live at the 9:30 Club (2001)	Put Your Hands Up! (2002)	Best of Chuck Brown (2005)

Professional ratings
Review scores
Source	Rating
AllMusic	4/5 stars
ARTISTdirect	4/5 stars
Robert Christgau	(2-star Honorable Mention)

Put Your Hands Up! (also titled as Put Your Hands Up! The Tribute Concert to Chuck Brown, named by Jahi Banks through a local contest held by TMOTTGOGO. ) is a double-live-tribute album released on August 20, 2002, by the Washington, D.C.-based go-go musician Chuck Brown. The album was recorded live at the 9:30 Club in Washington, D.C., and is a continuation of the 2001 album Your Game...Live at the 9:30 Club. The live performances was a collaboration between Chuck Brown and some of the musicians that were influenced by his works. The album consists of go-go renditions of classic neo soul, go-go, hip hop, and blues songs.

== Track listing ==
Disc 1
No.	Title	Contributing artist(s)	Length
1.	"Let the Party Begin" (Chuck Brown)	Experience Unlimited	3:49
2.	"I Want You Back" (Berry Gordy/Alphonso Mizell/Freddie Perren/Deke Richards)	Experience Unlimited and Maiesha	3:53
3.	"Say Hey" (Gregory "Sugar Bear" Elliott)	Experience Unlimited	0:46
4.	"E.U. Freeze" (Gregory "Sugar Bear" Elliott)	Experience Unlimited	4:49
5.	"Dog Star" (George Clinton)	Experience Unlimited	1:59
6.	"Gimmie Dat Beat"	Experience Unlimited	1:32
7.	"Let's Freak-A-Deek"	Experience Unlimited	4:22
8.	"If You Like Go-Go Music"	Experience Unlimited	3:22
9.	"Da Butt" (Marcus Miller/Mark Stevens)	Experience Unlimited	4:13
10.	"Come Back in One Piece" (Stephen Garrett/Earl Simmons/Irving Lorenzo/Rob Meys/George Clinton/William Collins)	BackYard Band	4:20
11.	"Wind Me Up G"	BackYard Band	5:33
12.	"Thong Song" (Mark Andrews/Tim Kelley/Bob Robinson/Eric Frankenberg/David Askew/Desmond Child/Robi Rosa)	BackYard Band	3:17
13.	"Skillet"	BackYard Band	6:29
14.	"Ready for Love" (Blue Miller)	911 Band	2:27
15.	"Time to Party" (Donnell Floyd)	911 Band	3:13
16.	"911"	911 Band	4:54
17.	"Brown & White"	911 Band	4:31
18.	"Uh Oh/You Don't Know Me"	911 Band	4:59

Disc 2
No.	Title	Contributing artist(s)	Length
1.	"Mister Magic" (Ralph MacDonald/William Salter)	Chuck Brown	7:34
2.	"LaDiDaDi" (Doug E. Fresh/Slick Rick)	Chuck Brown	2:14
3.	"Get Your Hands Up!"	Chuck Brown	0:37
4.	"Country Boy" (Muddy Waters)	Chuck Brown	6:16
5.	"Family Affair" (Sylvester "Sly Stone" Stewart)	Chuck Brown	5:57
6.	"Are You Ready for a Little Benny?"	Little Benny	3:07
7.	"Back Up Against the Wall" (Michael Hughes)	Andre "Whiteboy" Johnson	3:09
8.	"Keepin' it Gangsta"	Big G	2:52
9.	"Get Ur Freak On" (Melissa Elliott/Tim Mosley)	Little Benny	2:51
10.	"It Don't Mean a Thing / Midnight Sun / Moody's Mood for Love / Woody Woodpecker theme" (Sonny Burke/Duke Ellington/Lionel Hampton/James Moody)	Chuck Brown	11:23
Total length:			1:57:34

== Personnel ==
Adapted from AllMusic

- Chuck Brown – lead vocals, electric guitar
- John M. Buchannan – keyboards, trombone
- Leroy Fleming – tenor saxophone, vocals
- Curtis Johnson – keyboards
- Donald Tillery – trumpet, vocals
- Ricardo D. Wellman – drums
- Rowland Smith – congas, vocals
- Glenn Ellis – bass guitar, percussion
- Cherie Mitchell – keyboards
- Louie Oxley – keyboards
- E.U. – guest artist
- Gregory "Sugar Bear" Elliott – bass guitar, guest vocals
- Kent Wood – keyboards
- Tony Fisher – guest artist
- 911 – guest artist
- BackYard Band – guest artist
- Little Benny – guest artist
- Byron "B.J." Jackson – bass guitar
- Brad Clements – trumpet
- Dave "32" Ellis – guest vocals
- Glenn Ellis – bass guitar
- Robert Green – percussion
- Jim McFalls – trombone
- Bryan Mills – keyboards, saxophone
