= Blow Your Whistle: Original Old School Breaks & Classic Funk Bombs =

Greatest hits album by The Soul Searchers
- Released: February 19, 2007
- Genre: Go-go; jazz-funk; soul
- Length: 53:47
- Label: Vampisoul; B000M2E8LI
- Producer: Carroll Hynson; Joe Tate

The Soul Searchers chronology
Salt of the Earth (1974)	Blow Your Whistle: Original Old School Breaks & Classic Funk Bombs (2007)

Blow Your Whistle: Original Old School Breaks & Classic Funk Bombs is a greatest hits album by American go-go and soul band The Soul Searchers. The album was released on February 19, 2007 and consists of a compilation of twelve digitally remastered songs from the group's two previously released albums (We the People and Salt of the Earth).

== Track listing ==
No.	Title	Writer(s)	Length
1.	"Blow Your Whistle"	Chuck Brown; Maxx Kidd	3:01
2.	"It's All in Your Mind"	Chuck Brown; John Buchanan	2:55
3.	"Think"	James Brown	4:31
4.	"We the People"	Chuck Brown; John Buchanan	5:12
5.	"Ain’t it Heavy"	John "JB" Buchanan	5:58
6.	"If it Ain’t Funky"	Chuck Brown	3:56
7.	"I Rolled It, You Hold It"	John "JB" Buchanan	4:59
8.	"Funk to the Folks"	John "JB" Buchanan	4:15
9.	"Ashley's Roachclip"	Lloyd Pinchback	5:35
10.	"1993"	John "JB" Buchanan	4:41
11.	"Soul to the People"	The Soul Searchers	2:52
12.	"Blowout"	John "JB" Buchanan	5:54
Total length:			53:47

== Personnel ==
- Chuck Brown – electric guitar, lead vocals
- John Enwell – bass guitar
- Kenneth Scoggins – drums
- Lino A. Druitt – congas, percussion
- Lloyd Pinchback – flute, saxophone, percussion
- John "JB" Buchanan – trombone, piano, synthesizer, vocals
- Hilton C. Selton Jr. – organ
- Horace Brock – organ
- Bennie Braxton – organ, vocals
- Donald Tillery – trumpet, percussion, vocals
- James Maycock – compilation assembly, liner notes
