= We Got This (Chuck Brown album) =

Studio album by Chuck Brown
- Released: September 21, 2010
- Venues: 9:30 Club; Washington, D.C.
- Genres: Go-go; neo soul; jazz-funk; hip-hop
- Length: 1:34:17
- Label: Raw Venture
- Producers: Tom Goldfogle (exec.); Cutter Hodierne; Lorenzo Johnson; Carl Thompson

Chuck Brown chronology
We're About the Business (2007)	We Got This (2010)	Beautiful Life (2014)

Professional ratings
Review scores
Source	Rating
AllMusic	4.5/5 stars
ARTISTdirect	3.5/5 stars
Blurt	8/10 stars
The Wall Street Journal	(favorable)
Washington City Paper	(favorable)

We Got This is a triple-studio album released by the Washington, D.C.–based go-go musician Chuck Brown. The triple-album consists of one audio CD containing five new songs, one 22-track audio CD from Chuck Brown's live concert at the 9:30 Club, and one video DVD of the same show. The 22-track songs are presented as one continuous medley, including many of his well-known songs. We Got This consists of collaborations with Jill Scott, Ledisi, and Marcus Miller. The album was dedicated to the memories of Little Benny. We Got This was also Brown's last album to be recorded and released during his lifetime.

The single "LOVE" received a Grammy nomination for "Best R&B Performance by a Duo or Group with Vocals". However, the song lost the award to "Soldier of Love" by Sade at the 53rd Annual Grammy Awards.

== Track listing ==
Disc 1: The Studio
No.	Title	Writer(s)	Length
1.	"All for You" (featuring Marcus Miller)	Kevin Blackmon; Chuck Brown; Carl "Chucky" Thompson	3:39
2.	"Funky Stuff" (featuring Ledisi)	Chuck Brown; Lorenzo Johnson; Ledisi	4:41
3.	"Jingle Jangle"	Kevin Blackmon; Chuck Brown; Brian Craig; Carl "Chucky" Thompson	4:22
4.	"LOVE" (featuring Jill Scott and Marcus Miller)	Kevin Blackmon; Chuck Brown; Carl "Chucky" Thompson	4:01
5.	"Senorita"	Kevin Blackmon; Chuck Brown; Diana Linda; Carl "Chucky" Thompson	3:54

Disc 2: Live at the 9:30 Club (audio CD version)
No.	Title	Writer(s)	Length
1.	"Wind Me Up!"	Chuck Brown	3:12
2.	"Rappaz R. N. Dainja (Instrumental)"	Anthony Best; Omar Credle; Lawrence Parker; Jaco Pastorius	4:20
3.	"We the People"	Chuck Brown; John "JB" Buchanan	1:04
4.	"Funky Beat"	Chuck Brown	2:20
5.	"I'm Your Man"	Mel London; Ellas McDaniel; McKinley Morganfield	6:58
6.	"It Don't Mean a Thing"	Duke Ellington; Irving Mills	4:38
7.	"Midnight Sun"	Sonny Burke; Lionel Hampton; Johnny Mercer	3:12
8.	"Moody's Mood for Love"	Dorothy Fields; Jimmy McHugh; James Moody	6:03
9.	"Woody Woodpecker"	Louis Jordan; Joe Willoughby	2:55
10.	"Give the Bass Player Some"	Chuck Brown	1:37
11.	"Harlem Nocturne"	Earle Hagen	7:21
12.	"Ego" (featuring Cherie Mitchell)	Beyoncé Knowles; Harold Lilly; Elvis Williams	3:42
13.	"Single Ladies (Put a Ring on It)" (featuring Cherie Mitchell)	Thaddis Harrell; Beyoncé Knowles; Terius Nash	2:43
14.	"Run Joe"	Louis Jordan; Joe Willoughby	4:04
15.	"Give It Up for Little Benny"	Chuck Brown	3:12
16.	"Do You Know What Time it Is?" (featuring Little Benny and Andre "Whiteboy" Johnson)	Mohandes Dewese	3:10
17.	"Cat In the Hat" (featuring Little Benny)	Anthony Harley; Mark Lawson	2:22
18.	"Freak-A-Deek"	Chuck Brown	0:41
19.	"One on One" (featuring Little Benny)	James "Jas Funk" Thomas	1:35
20.	"Lock It" (featuring Little Benny)	Micheal Neal; J. Karen Thomas	1:07
21.	"Chuck Baby" (featuring K.K.)	Kevin Blackmon; Carl Thompson	5:13
22.	"Bustin' Loose"	Chuck Brown	2:11

Disc 3: Live at the 9:30 Club (video DVD version)
No.	Title	Writer(s)	Length
1.	"Wind Me Up!"	Chuck Brown	3:12
2.	"Rappaz R. N. Dainja (Instrumental)"	Anthony Best; Omar Credle; Lawrence Parker; Jaco Pastorius	4:20
3.	"We the People"	Chuck Brown; John "JB" Buchanan	1:04
4.	"Funky Beat"	Chuck Brown	2:20
5.	"I'm Your Man"	Mel London; Ellas McDaniel; McKinley Morganfield	6:58
6.	"It Don't Mean a Thing"	Duke Ellington; Irving Mills	4:38
7.	"Midnight Sun"	Sonny Burke; Lionel Hampton; Johnny Mercer	3:12
8.	"Moody's Mood for Love"	Dorothy Fields; Jimmy McHugh; James Moody	6:03
9.	"Woody Woodpecker"	Louis Jordan; Joe Willoughby	2:55
10.	"Give the Bass Player Some"	Chuck Brown	1:37
11.	"Harlem Nocturne"	Earle Hagen	7:21
12.	"Ego" (featuring Cherie Mitchell)	Beyoncé Knowles; Harold Lilly; Elvis Williams	3:42
13.	"Single Ladies (Put a Ring on It)" (featuring Cherie Mitchell)	Thaddis Harrell; Beyoncé Knowles; Terius Nash	2:43
14.	"Run Joe"	Louis Jordan; Joe Willoughby	4:04
15.	"Give It Up for Little Benny"	Chuck Brown	3:12
16.	"Do You Know What Time it Is?" (featuring Little Benny and Andre "Whiteboy" Johnson)	Mohandes Dewese	3:10
17.	"Cat In the Hat" (featuring Little Benny)	Anthony Harley; Mark Lawson	2:22
18.	"Freak-A-Deek"	Chuck Brown	0:41
19.	"One on One" (featuring Little Benny)	James "Jas Funk" Thomas	1:35
20.	"Lock It" (featuring Little Benny)	Micheal Neal; J. Karen Thomas	1:07
21.	"Chuck Baby" (featuring K.K.)	Kevin Blackmon; Carl Thompson	5:13
22.	"Bustin' Loose"	Chuck Brown	2:11
23.	"Block Party" (music video)	Jerry Leiber; Barry Mann; Mike Stoller; Cynthia Weil	4:15
24.	"The Party Roll" (music video)	Chuck Brown; Carl Thompson	4:00

== Personnel ==
- Chuck Brown – electric guitar, lead vocals
- "Sweet" Cherie Mitchell – vocals, keyboards
- K.K. Donelson – vocals
- Marcus Miller – bass guitar, guest vocals
- Anthony Harley – trumpet, guest vocals
- Andre "Whiteboy" Johnson – guest vocals
- Jill Scott – guest vocals
- Ledisi – guest vocals, producer
- "Blazin" Bryan Mills – tenor saxophone, keyboard, background vocals
- Carl "Chucky" Thompson – producer
- Maurice "Mighty Moe" Hagans – percussions
- Karlston "Ice" Ross – bass guitar
- Kenny "Kwickfoot" Gross – drums
- "Bad" Brad Clements – trumpet
- Greg Boyer – trombone
- Marlon Winder – trumpet
