= Any Other Way to Go? =

Any Other Way To Go?

Live album by Chuck Brown & the Soul Searchers
- Released: 1987
- Venue: The Crystal Skate; Temple Hills, Maryland
- Studio: Sheffield Studio
- Genre: Go-go; jazz-funk
- Length: 73:17
- Label: Rhythm Attack Productions
- Producer: Reo Edwards; Stephen Meyner

Chuck Brown & the Soul Searchers chronology
Go Go Swing Live (1986)	Any Other Way To Go? (1987)	Live '87 – D.C. Bumpin' Y'all (1988)

Professional ratings
Review scores
Source	Rating
AllMusic	4/5 stars
ARTISTdirect	4/5 stars
musicHound R&B	(4/5)

Any Other Way To Go? (also titled as Live at Crystal Skates) is a live album released in 1987 by the Washington, D.C.–based go-go band Chuck Brown & the Soul Searchers. The album was recorded live at the Crystal Skate in Temple Hills, Maryland. The album consists go-go renditions of classic jazz and swing songs performed with a go-go beat.

The album is especially known for go-go rendition of Grandmaster Flash and the Furious Five's hip-hop song "The Message", and the go-go songs "Be Bumpin' Fresh" and "Go-Go Drug Free" (which featured a cameo rap from the former Mayor of the District of Columbia Marion Barry).

== Track listing ==
No.	Title	Writer(s)	Length
1.	"It Don't Mean a Thing (If It Don't Have the Go Go Swing)"	Duke Ellington; Irving Mills	3:37
2.	"Midnight Sun"	Sonny Burke; Lionel Hampton; Johnny Mercer	3:25
3.	"Moody's Mood"	Dorothy Fields; Jimmy McHugh; James Moody	5:07
4.	"Woody Woodpecker"	Louis Jordan; Joe Willoughby	4:46
5.	"Here We Go Again"	Chuck Brown	5:14
6.	"Harlem Nocturne"	Earle H. Hagen	5:35
7.	"The Message"	Edward G. Fletcher; Melle Mel; Clifton "Jiggs" Chase; Sylvia Robinson	4:50
8.	"Run Joe"	Louis Jordan; Joe Willoughby	8:11
9.	"Stormy Monday"	T-Bone Walker	5:46
10.	"Family Affair"	Sylvester "Sly Stone" Stewart	7:25
11.	"Do That Stuff"	Chuck Brown	3:51
12.	"Go-Go Drug Free"	Chuck Brown	7:01
13.	"Be Bumpin' Fresh"	Chuck Brown	8:29
Total length:			1:13:17

== Personnel ==
- Chuck Brown – lead vocals, electric guitar
- John M. Buchannan – keyboards, trombone
- Leroy Fleming – tenor saxophone, background vocals
- Curtis Johnson – keyboards
- Donald Tillery – trumpet, background vocals
- Ricardo D. Wellman – drums
- Rowland Smith – congas, background vocals
- Glenn Ellis – bass guitar, percussions
