= Meet Me at the Go-Go =

Compilation album by Various Artists
- Released: July 7, 2003
- Genre: Go-go; old-school hip hop
- Length: 74:21
- Label: Sanctuary; Discotheque; (DQFDV 002)
- Producer: Mark Cotgrove

Meet Me at the Go-Go is a compilation album originally released on July 7, 2003. The compilation consist of eleven previously released songs by prominent Washington, D.C.–based go-go bands. The album was compiled by Snowboy.

== Track listing ==
No.	Title	Performer(s)	Length
1.	"E Flat Boogie"	Trouble Funk	8:47
2.	"Let's Get Small"	Trouble Funk	5:32
3.	"It's in the Mix"	Slim	5:58
4.	"Meet Me at the Go-Go"	Hot, Cold Sweat	8:07
5.	"Arkade Funk"	Tilt	6:12
6.	"We Need Some Money (Bout Money)"	Chuck Brown & the Soul Searchers	4:28
7.	"All We Want is Go-Go"	AM-FM	6:19
8.	"Scratchin' to the Funk"	Doctor Funnkenstein	9:41
9.	"All Wrapped Up in One"	T.T.E.D. All-Stars	5:46
10.	"Take It to the Top" (featuring Tommy Ski)	Skibone	6:01
11.	"Give It Here"	Rare Essence	7:30
Total length:			74:21

== See also ==
- Go-Go Crankin', 1985 compilation album
