= Gimmie Dat Beat =

Remix album by Various Artist
- Released: April 8, 1997
- Genre: Go-go; hip-hop
- Length: 69:18
- Label: Liaison Records
- Producer: DJ Kool; Reo Edwards; Andre Johnson

Gimmie Dat Beat (also titled as Gimmie Dat Beat: The Best of D.C. Go Go, Volume 2) is a remix-compilation album consisting of prominent go-go songs remixed and compiled by DJ Kool. The album was released on April 8, 1997.

== Track listing ==
| No. | Title | Contributing artist(s) | Length |
|---|---|---|---|
| 1. | "Intro" | DJ Kool | 0:28 |
| 2. | "The Bud" | Huck-A-Bucks | 4:34 |
| 3. | "Uh Oh (Heads Up)" (Derek Floyd) | Rare Essence | 4:24 |
| 4. | "Bounce to This" (Northeast Groovers) | Northeast Groovers | 3:53 |
| 5. | "Whose in the House" | BackYard Band | 2:40 |
| 6. | "The Word" (Steve Harrison / R. Smith) | Junk Yard Band | 5:47 |
| 7. | "Where My Troopers At?" | Rare Essence | 5:39 |
| 8. | "It's Time (64X's)" (Roy Battle / Huck-A-Bucks / Joseph Timms / Ricky Yancy) | Huck-A-Bucks | 6:02 |
| 9. | "Booty Call" (Northeast Groovers) | Northeast Groovers | 4:43 |
| 10. | "Sardines" (Steve Harrison / M.C. / R. Smith) | Junk Yard Band | 6:19 |
| 11. | "Shook One" | BackYard Band | 7:09 |
| 12. | "The Water" (Northeast Groovers) | Northeast Groovers | 3:31 |
| 13. | "Goosebumps" | Northeast Groovers | 4:56 |
| 14. | "Run Joe" (Louis Jordan / Walter Merrick / Joe Willoughby) | Chuck Brown & the Soul Searchers | 8:38 |
| Total length: | | | 69:18 |

== Personnel ==
Adapted from AllMusic

- DJ Kool – compilation producer, DJ, mixing, vocals
- BackYard Band – primary artist
- Chuck Brown & the Soul Searchers – primary artist
- Huck-A-Bucks – primary artist
- Junk Yard Band – primary artist
- Michael "Funky Ned" Neal – mixing
- Northeast Groovers – primary artist
- Rare Essence – primary artist
