= Your Game...Live at the 9:30 Club =

Live album by Chuck Brown
- Released: May 15, 2001
- Venue: The 9:30 Club
- Genre: Go-go; hip hop; neo soul; R&B
- Length: 66:29
- Label: Raw Venture Records
- Producer: Stephen Meyner (exec); Reo Edwards

Chuck Brown chronology
The Spirit of Christmas (1999)	Your Game...Live at the 9:30 Club (2001)	Put Your Hands Up! (2002)

Professional ratings
Review scores
Source	Rating
AllMusic	4/5 stars
ARTISTdirect	4/5 stars
Robert Christgau	(2-star Honorable Mention)

Your Game...Live at the 9:30 Club is a live-tribute album released on May 15, 2001, by the Washington, D.C.–based go-go musician Chuck Brown. The album was recorded live at The 9:30 Club in Washington, D.C. The live performance was a collaboration between Chuck Brown and some of the musicians who were influenced by his works. The album consists of go-go renditions of classic neo soul, go-go, jazz and blues songs.

== Track listing ==
No.	Title	Writer(s)	Length
1.	"Wind Me Up Chuck/Hoochie Coochie Man"	Willie Dixon	6:21
2.	"Feel Like Movin' That Body"	Chuck Brown	1:05
3.	"Chameleon"	Herbie Hancock; Paul Jackson; Bennie Maupin; Harvey Mason	6:17
4.	"Get Your Hands Up/Playing Your Game Baby"	Chuck Brown	7:24
5.	"It's Love" (featuring Cherie "Sweet Cherie" Mitchell)	Jill Scott; Andre Harris	5:27
6.	"2001 (That'll Work)"	Chuck Brown	5:23
7.	"People Make the World Go Round"	Thom Bell; Linda Creed	4:50
8.	"Wind Us Up Funk & Benny" (featuring Jas Funk and Little Benny)	Chuck Brown	4:58
9.	"One on One" (featuring Jas Funk and Little Benny)	J. Jones; J. Karen Thomas; R. Williams	4:44
10.	"Hey Go Go Mickey"	Chuck Brown	2:06
11.	"No Diggity" (featuring Big Tony)	Chauncey Hannibal; Teddy Riley; William Stewart; Richard Vick; Bill Withers	3:23
12.	"You Know What Time It Is" (featuring Andre "Whiteboy" Johnson)	Chuck Brown	3:44
13.	"Go Go Swing Outro" (featuring Little Benny, Jas Funk and Big Tony)	Chuck Brown	5:45
14.	"Hah Man"	Chuck Brown	4:41
Total length:			66:29

== Personnel ==
- Chuck Brown – lead vocals, electric guitar
- John M. Buchannan – keyboards, trombone
- Leroy Fleming – tenor saxophone, background vocals
- Curtis Johnson – keyboards
- Donald Tillery – trumpet, background vocals
- Ricardo D. Wellman – drums
- Rowland Smith – congas, background vocals
- Glenn Ellis – bass guitar, percussions
