= 1993 (disambiguation) =

1993 was a common year starting on Friday of the Gregorian calendar.

1993 may also refer to:

- 1993 (number)
- 1993 (film)
- 1993 (TV series), a 2017 Italian television series
- Iris 1993, a 1993 album by Romanian band Iris
- "1993", a 1972 song by The Soul Searchers, from the album We the People
- "1993", a 2019 song by Dreamville, from the album Revenge of the Dreamers III
