= Good to Go (soundtrack) =

Album

Soundtrack album by Various Artists
- Released: August 1, 1986
- Genres: Go-go; dancehall
- Length: 44:50
- Labels: 4th & B'way; Island
- Producers: Maxx Kidd; Rob Fraboni; Robert Reed; Tony Fisher

Professional ratings
Review scores
Source	Rating
AllMusic	3/5 stars
musicHound R&B	(3/5)
Robert Christgau	B+

Good to Go is a soundtrack album released on August 1, 1986, in conjunction with the release of the film Good to Go. The album features songs by prominent Washington, D.C.–based go-go bands and Jamaican-dancehall artists from the early-1980s.

== Track listing ==
Side A
No.	Title	Contributing artist	Length
1.	"Good to Go" (James Avery / Tony Fisher / Robert Reed)	Trouble Funk	3:40
2.	"Meet Me at the Go-Go" (Darius Moss)	Hot, Cold Sweat	4:31
3.	"Still Smokin'" (James Avery / Tony Fisher / Robert Reed)	Trouble Funk	5:05
4.	"Make 'em Move (The Wrecking Crew's Theme)" (Afrika Bambaataa / Bernie Worrell / Bill Laswell / Sly and Robbie)	Sly Dunbar & Robbie Shakespeare	4:33
5.	"E.U. Freeze" (Gregory "Sugar Bear" Elliott)	E.U.	4:13
6.	"Keys (The Chemist's Theme)" (Wally Badarou)	Wally Badarou	2:12

Side B
No.	Title	Contributing artist	Length
1.	"We Need Money" (Chuck Brown)	Chuck Brown & the Soul Searchers	3:52
2.	"Status Quo (Little Beats' Theme)" (W. Edward Thompson)	Donald Banks	2:57
3.	"Drop the Bomb" (James Avery / Chester Davis / Tony Fisher / Robert Reed)	Trouble Funk	4:16
4.	"Riot Zone (Call the Police)" (Ini Kamoze)	Ini Kamoze	1:24
5.	"Like It" (Robert Reed / Tony Fisher)	Trouble Funk	3:55
6.	"Movin' and Groovin'" (Anthony Reed Williams / Carl Jones / Derrick "Doc" Pearson)	Redds & the Boys	3:07
7.	"Good to Go (reprise)" (Robert Reed)	Trouble Funk	4:12
Total length:			44:50
