= Bustin' Loose (Chuck Brown album) =

Studio album by Chuck Brown
- Released: 1979
- Studio: Sigma Sound, Philadelphia, Pennsylvania
- Genre: Go-go; soul; jazz-funk
- Length: 39:06
- Label: Source, MCA
- Producer: James Purdie; Logan H. Westbrooks

Chuck Brown chronology
Salt of the Earth (1974)	Bustin' Loose (1979)	Funk Express (1980)

Singles from Winner Takes It All
- 1. "Bustin' Loose" Released: October 1978; 2. "Never Gonna Give You Up" Released: 1979; 3. "Game Seven" Released: April 1979

Professional ratings
Review scores
Source	Rating
AllMusic	4.5/5 stars
Artistdirect	4.5/5 stars
Christgau's Record Guide	B+
MusicHound R&B	3/5 stars
The Virgin Encyclopedia of R&B and Soul	3/5 stars

Bustin' Loose is a studio album released in 1979 by the Washington, D.C.–based go-go band Chuck Brown & the Soul Searchers. The album includes the charting single and one of the all-time classic go-go songs "Bustin' Loose", along with a remake of the classic Jerry Butler's soul ballad "Never Give You Up" from the 1968 album The Ice Man Cometh.

Bustin' Loose became Brown's first album to chart on the Billboard 200, where it peaked at number 31. On August 10, 1979, Bustin' Loose was certified gold by the Recording Industry Association of America, for shipments of 500,000 copies in the United States. The single "Bustin' Loose" was also certified gold by the RIAA on March 14, 1979.

== Track listing ==
No.	Title	Writer(s)	Length
1.	"Bustin' Loose"	Chuck Brown	7:39
2.	"Never Gonna Give You Up"	Jerry Butler; Kenneth Gamble, Leon Huff	5:40
3.	"If It Ain't Funky"	Chuck Brown	6:01
4.	"I Gotcha Now"	Chuck Brown; John "JB" Buchanan; Leroy Fleming; Curtis Johnson; Donald Tillery; Jerry Wilder	5:03
5.	"Could It Be Love"	Shirley Chevalier; James Purdie	5:19
6.	"Game Seven"	Chuck Brown; John "JB" Buchanan; Leroy Fleming; Curtis Johnson; Donald Tillery; Jerry Wilder	6:13
7.	"Berro E Sombaro"	Chuck Brown; John "JB" Buchanan; Leroy Fleming; Curtis Johnson; Donald Tillery; Jerry Wilder	3:11
Total length:			39:06

== Personnel ==
- Chuck Brown – lead vocals, electric guitar
- Jerry Wilder – bass guitar, backing vocals
- Gregory Gerran – congas, percussion
- Ricky Wellman – drums
- Leroy Fleming – tenor saxophone, flute, timbales, backing vocals
- Skip Fennell – keyboards
- Curtis Johnson – organ
- John Buchanan – keyboards, trombone, backing vocals
- Donald Tillery – trumpet, tambourine, backing vocals
- Leron Young – lead guitar on "Never Gonna Give You Up" and "Could It Be Love"
- Don Renaldo – strings on "Never Gonna Give You Up" and "Could It Be Love"
- Lincoln Ross – trombone on "Bustin' Loose"

Technical

- Logan H. Westbrooks - executive producer
- Carl Paruolo - engineer
