= Go-Go Crankin' =

Go Go Crankin'

Compilation album by Various Artists
- Released: 1985
- Genres: Go-go; old-school hip hop; funk
- Length: 49:06
- Labels: 4th & B'way; Island; T.T.E.D.
- Producers: Eric "E.T." Thorngren; Maxx Kidd

Professional ratings
Review scores
Source	Rating
Robert Christgau	A−
musicHound R&B	(4.5/5)
The New York Times	(favorable)
People	4/4 stars
The Rolling Stone Album Guide	4.5/5 stars

Go-Go Crankin' (also titled as Go-Go Crankin': Paint the White House Black) is a compilation album originally released in 1985. The compilation consist of ten original songs by prominent Washington, D.C.–based go-go bands of that time period. The music is heavily influenced by the popularity of go-go in the mid-80s in Washington, D.C., and throughout the Northeast. The album has been considered to be influential to the growing popularity of hip hop and go-go music in the 1980s.

== Track listing ==
Side B
No.	Title	Performer(s)	Length
1.	"Good to Go"	Slim	4:48
2.	"Movin' and Groovin"	Redds and the Boys	3:59
3.	"Let's Get Small"	Trouble Funk	5:36
4.	"We Need Some Money (Bout Money)"	Chuck Brown & the Soul Searchers	4:32
5.	"Ooh La La La"	E.U.	5:11
6.	"Drop the Bomb"	Trouble Funk	5:18
7.	"It's In the Mix"	Slim	4:23
8.	"Somebody's Ringing That Doorbell (Express Yourself)"	E.U.	4:39
9.	"Say What"	Trouble Funk	5:18
10.	"Happy Feet"	Mass Extension	5:15
Total length:			49:06

== See also ==
- Go Go Live at the Capital Centre, 1987 go-go concert
- The Go Go Posse, 1988 compilation album
- The Beat: Go-Go's Fusion of Funk and Hip-Hop, 2001 compilation album
- Meet Me at the Go-Go, 2003 compilation album
