= We Got This =

We Got This may refer to:

- We Got This (Chopper City Boyz album), 2007
- We Got This (Chuck Brown album), 2010
- We Got This (O'G3NE album), 2016
- "We Got This", song by A Day to Remember from Bad Vibrations
- We Got This, comedic debate-style podcast Maximum Fun
- We Got This, Swedish comedy TV series, 2020
