= Never Give You Up =

1968 song performed by Jerry Butler

Single by Jerry Butler

from the album The Soul Goes On, The Ice Man Cometh
- A-side: "Never Give You Up"
- B-side: "Beside You"
- Released: 1968
- Studio: Sigma Sound, Philadelphia, Pennsylvania
- Genre: Soul
- Length: 2:56
- Label: Mercury
- Songwriters: Gamble; Huff; Butler

Jerry Butler singles chronology
""Lost"" (1967)	"Never Give You Up" (1968)	""Hey, Western Union Man"" (1968)

"Never Give You Up" is a single by Jerry Butler that reached no. 20 in the Billboard chart and no. 16 in Canada in 1968. It was written by Gamble & Huff. Butler was also credited as co-composer. The song has also been covered by Eddie Floyd, Buddy Greco, Chuck Brown and the Soul Searchers, Leonard Julien III, Rod Stewart and The Black Keys.

== Background ==
The credited composers on the single are Gamble, Huff and Butler. The single was released on Mercury 72798 in April 1968. The song spent 14 weeks on the Hot 100 chart, eventually peaking at no. 20 on July 6, 1968. It also peaked at no. 16 in Canada the same month. This track was also recorded at the Cameo Parkway Reco Arts studio in Philadelphia and featured musicians who would later go on to play on many groups' hit records recorded at Sigma Sound Studios in Philadelphia for such artists as The Spinners, The Stylistics and Harold Melvin and the Blue Notes. The personnel on the session included Norman Harris and Bobby Eli on guitar, Ronnie Baker on bass, Leon Huff on piano, and Earl Young on Drums and Vince Montana on vibes. The session was engineered by Joe Tarsia and arranged by Bobby Martin.

== Other versions ==
=== 1960s ===
Thee Midnighters had their version of the song as the B side of their "Chicano Power" single which was released around 1967 - 1968. Eddie Floyd covered the song which appeared on his 1968 Stax album, I've Never Found A Girl. A version by Shirley And The Shirelles was recorded. It was included as the B side of single "Go Away And Find Yourself" which was released on Bell in 1969. Buddy Greco recorded a version of the song which appeared as the B side of his single, "Everybody Gets To Go To The Moon", released on Wand Records in 1970. It was also on his Let the Sunshine In album which was previously released on Scepter Records SPS 579 in 1969. A group called The Road had a version on their self-titled album in which was released on Kama Sutra in 1969.

=== 1970s to 1980s ===
In 1971, Isaac Hayes released a version of this song on his album Black Moses. In 1977, a single by Bonnie Bramlett and Dobie Gray was released on Capricorn 2089 039. Chuck Brown and the Soul Searchers recorded a version that appeared on their 1979 Bustin' Loose album.

=== 1990s to 2010s ===
The 2005 album Push Comes to Shove by rapper M.E.D. featured the song "Never Give U Up", produced by Oh No, who built the instrumental backing around a portion of the Chuck Brown & the Soul Searchers version of "Never Give You Up". Leonard Julien III recorded the song and it appeared on his Reflections of Soul album which came out on Modeste Records in 2007. Rod Stewart recorded the song as well and it appears on the RCA 88697603432 release of his 2009 Soulbook album. The Black Keys recorded a version which appeared on their Brothers album which was released in 2010. Their version was also used in the Series 3 Episode 4 of the BBC series Luther, which starred Idris Elba. Tony Strong & the Philly Soul recorded a version that was included on their 2012 album "It Ain’t Over".
