= Time & Faith =

Studio album by Jerry Butler
- Released: 1992
- Genre: R&B, soul
- Label: Urgent!/Ichiban
- Producer: Danny Jones, Tim Whitsett

Jerry Butler chronology
Iceman: The Mercury Years (1992)	Time & Faith (1992)	Simply Beautiful (1994)

Time & Faith is an album by the soul musician Jerry Butler, released in 1992. Butler's first studio album in almost a decade, it was recorded during his tenure as a Cook County commissioner.

The album peaked at No. 92 on Billboard's Top R&B Albums chart.

== Production ==
Recorded in Memphis, the album was produced by Danny Jones and Tim Whitsett. It includes covers of Willie Nelson's "Angel Flying Too Close to the Ground", Jimmy Cliff's "Sitting in Limbo", and Curtis Mayfield's "Need to Belong".

== Critical reception ==
Professional ratings
Review scores
Source	Rating
AllMusic	2/5 stars
Chicago Tribune	3/4 stars
The Encyclopedia of Popular Music	3/5 stars
MusicHound R&B: The Essential Album Guide	2/5 stars

The Chicago Tribune noted that "Butler sings about the enduring virtues of adult love like few other singers, and his backing musicians are restrained but soulful-far removed from the synth-drenched wallpaper that passes for R&B these days." USA Today stated that Butler is back to "caressing smooth ballads with his infectious rasp."

The Atlanta Journal-Constitution thought that the "title song, with a '90s beat and a catchy little chorus, is almost hypnotic ... [the album is] a hodgepodge of styles, but in the hands of the Ice Man, somehow it gels." The Fort Worth Star-Telegram deemed Time & Faith "a sort of low-key concept album about growing older alone and realizing how hard it is to find lasting love."

AllMusic wrote that "Time & Faith is fairly unpredictable; while 'Trying to Break the Habit' is a bluesy soul number, the ballads 'I Was Right About You' and 'You're the Only One' are essentially adult contemporary."

== Track listing ==
No.	Title	Length
1.	"Time & Faith"
2.	"Need to Belong"
3.	"Angel Flying Too Close to the Ground"
4.	"Trying to Break the Habit"
5.	"I Was Right About You"
6.	"You're the Only One"
7.	"Sure Feels Good"
8.	"Sitting in Limbo"
9.	"Time & Faith (Reprise)"
