= The Road (group) =

- Also known as: The Mellow Brick Road
- Origin: Buffalo, New York
- Genres: Rock, R&B
- Years active: 1968–1972
- Label: Kama Sutra

The Road was a rock band that was formed in 1967. They had a hit in Greece with a cover of the Zombies song "She's Not There". They released further singles on the Kama Sutra label. They broke up in the 1970s.

== History ==
The group origins can be traced to Buffalo, New York, where they started out in 1967 as The Mellow Brick Road. The original line-up was vocalists Phil and Jerry Hudson, bassist Joe Hesse, keyboardist Jim Hesse, guitarist Ralph Parker, and drummer Nick DiStefano. They released a single on the United Artists label, "Don't Put All Your Eggs In One Basket".

The group had a hit with She's Not There", which was released on Kama Sutra. By that time the group had become The Road. It sold in excess of 200,000 copies and registered at #88 in Cashbox, #79 in Canada, and managed to reach the charts in Greece.

Their album simply titled Road was released about a week before Christmas 1969. The 12 track album included "She's Not There", "A Taste of Honey", "Dance to the Music", "Never Gonna Give You Up", "Rock & Roll Woman", and "Mr. Soul", their latest single. By mid-February 1970, it had sold well in excess of 25,000 copies.

As of February 1970, the group was managed by Fred Saia. The line-up at the time consisted of band leader Jerry Hudson, Ralph Parker, Nick DiStefano, Joe Hesse, Phil Hudson, Jim Hesse and Larry Rizzuto, who had recently joined the band.

In 1971, their double album Cognition was released on Kama Sutra KSBS 2032. The reviewer noted the Scientology content with the music. A good deal of the material was composed by the band members.

They broke up in 1972, though the band re-grouped in 1974; sporadically, through the end of 1982, with varying musicians. They reunited once again in July 1989 for some local appearances with Three Dog Night.

Jerry Hudson, the lead singer recorded a solo single "Gillian Frank" bw "I'll Feel A Whole Lot Better", and it was released on the Bandstand Records label in 1972, also the Big Tree label in early 1973. Billboard reported in its February 10, 1973 issue that the single was bubbling under the Hot 100 at #117, and stayed there for another week.

Jerry Hudson (born Gerald K. Hudson Jr. on December 4, 1948 in Buffalo) died on November 4, 2019, at age 70. He had been hospitalized following a stroke.

=== Releases ===
Mellow Brick Road singles
Title	Label, cat	Year	Notes
"Don't Put All Your Eggs In One Basket" / "Other Side Of This Life"	United Artists UA 50333	1968	

The Road singles
Title	Label, cat	Year	Notes
"She's Not There" / "A Bummer"	Kama Sutra KA 256	1968	
"The Grass Looks Greener On The Other Side" / "In Love"	Kama Sutra KA-266	1969	
"Mr Soul" / "The Grass Looks Greener On The Other Side"	Kama Sutra KA 504	1970	
"If I Ever Needed A Woman" / "Alone"	Kama Sutra KA 531	1971	
"Night In The City" / "Feelin' The Sunshine"	Goodtime GT 4504	1974	
"She's Not There" / "A Bummer"	Radio Active Gold RD 67		
"Hard To Tell You Goodbye" / "Rosalie"	Road MC 5552		
"Music Man" / "You Give It All"	Road MC 5610	1977	

Albums
Title	Label, cat	Year	Peak positions	Notes
Title	Label, cat	Year	US 200	Notes
The Road	Kama Sutra KLPS 8075	1969	—	Debut album
The Road	Kama Sutra KSBS 2012	1970	199	Reissue of KLPS 8075
Cognition	Kama Sutra KSBS 2032	1971	—	2 LP
