= Only the Strong Survive (song) =

Single by Jerry Butler

from the album The Ice Man Cometh
- B-side: "Just Because I Really Love You"
- Released: February 1969
- Studio: Sigma Sound, Philadelphia, Pennsylvania
- Genre: Soul, proto-disco
- Label: Mercury (US); Philadelphia (UK)
- Songwriters: Jerry Butler, Kenny Gamble and Leon Huff

Jerry Butler singles chronology
"Are You Happy" (1968)	"Only the Strong Survive" (1969)	"Moody Woman" (1969)

"Only the Strong Survive" is a song written by Jerry Butler, Kenny Gamble, and Leon Huff and originally sung in 1968 by Jerry Butler, released on his album The Ice Man Cometh. It was the most successful single of his career, reaching number 4 on the Billboard Hot 100 and was number one for two weeks on the Billboard Black Singles Chart, in March and April 1969, respectively.

"Only the Strong Survive" was the first of two singles by Butler which were gold certified by the RIAA, selling over a million copies (the second was "Ain't Understanding Mellow" in 1972).

The song begins with a spoken recitation, that goes:

"I remember my first love affair. Somehow or another the whole dam thing went wrong. And my momma had some great advice. So, I thought I'd put it in the words of this song".

This is followed, in song, by the narrator, singing about the fact that the woman he loved was gone, and that his mother told him to stand up, be strong, and to look for another girl instead, after feeling depressed about the terrible ordeal.

Elvis Presley (1969), Skeeter Davis (1969), Billy Paul (1977), Rod Stewart (2009), Larry Carlton (2010), and Bruce Springsteen (on his album of the same name, 2022) also recorded "Only the Strong Survive." Davis's version appeared on her album Maryfrances, released in August 1969, and Presley's version on his From Elvis in Memphis album released in June 1969. In the UK, Billy Paul's version was released on the Philadelphia International label (PIR 5699). It entered the UK singles chart on November 17, 1977, had a chart life of seven weeks and a peak position of number 33. Rod Stewart's version was included as a bonus track on the UK release of his 25th studio album Soulbook (which reached number 9 on the UK albums chart). A 12" dance version by Precious Wilson was released in 1987.

Another version of this song was recorded by the Trammps in the Netherlands in 2003 and sounds similar to Billy Paul's version. The song appears on the compilation album Only the Strong Survive (Sony), which oddly enough shows the remaining four group members on the cover. There is also an extended club mix of this song on this CD. The club mix was produced by Maas and Van der Weyde.

== Chart history ==
=== Weekly charts ===
Chart (1969)	Peak position
Canada RPM Top Singles	4
UK Singles (OCC) (Billy Paul's version)	33
U.S. Billboard Hot 100	4
U.S. Billboard R&B	1
U.S. Cash Box Top 100	5

=== Year-end charts ===
Chart (1969)	Rank
Canada	79
U.S. Billboard Hot 100	38
U.S. Cash Box	74
