= The Sinbad Show =

American television sitcom

- Genre: Sitcom
- Created by: Gary Murphy; Larry Strawther; Sinbad
- Developed by: Michael Jacobs; David A. Caplan; Brian LaPan
- Starring: Sinbad; T. K. Carter; Salma Hayek; Erin Davis; Willie Norwood; Hal Williams
- Theme music composer: Chuck Brown
- Opening theme: "Hah Man"
- Composer: Kurt Farquhar
- Country of origin: United States
- Original language: English
- No. of seasons: 1
- No. of episodes: 24

Production
- Executive producers: Ralph Farquhar; Michael Jacobs; Gary Murphy; Marc Sotkin; Larry Strawther; Michael J. Weithorn
- Producer: Michael Petok
- Production companies: Michael Jacobs Productions; David & Goliath Productions; Gary Murphy-Larry Strawther Productions; Touchstone Television

Original release
- Network: Fox
- Release: September 16, 1993 – April 21, 1994

The Sinbad Show is an American television sitcom starring comedian David "Sinbad" Adkins that premiered on September 16, 1993, on Fox. The show was created by Sinbad, Gary Murphy, and Larry Strawther, and developed by Michael Jacobs, Dave Caplan, and Brian LaPan. Its main plot is about a bachelor taking in two orphaned children. Chuck Brown performed the theme music. It was cancelled on April 21, 1994.

== Overview ==
The series follows the life of David Bryan (Sinbad), a carefree bachelor who works as a video game designer, who becomes a single parent when he adopts two orphaned children, Zana (Erin Davis) and L.J. Beckley (Willie Norwood), who face several issues which they work through together.

The show follows David as he guides L.J. and Zana in their new lives, including counselling L.J. on dealing with school, friendships, girls, and being a teenager and helping Zana learn how to function in everyday life. Meanwhile, Clarence shares his antics and David's parents help him deal with raising kids.

== Cast ==
=== Main ===
- Sinbad as David Bryan
- T. K. Carter as Clarence Hall
- Salma Hayek as Gloria Contreras (3 episodes, she was given "starring" billing in episodes she appeared in)
- Erin Davis as Zana Beckley
- Willie Norwood as L.J. Beckley
- Hal Williams as Rudy Bryan

=== Recurring ===
- Nancy Wilson as Louise Bryan

== Cancellation ==
The Sinbad Show was cancelled after its first season, and aired its last episode on April 21, 1994. It aired at 8:30 p.m., following The Simpsons, Thursday nights on Fox. The series was one of several shows featuring predominantly black casts that were cancelled by Fox around the same time (others included Roc, South Central and In Living Color). Activist Jesse Jackson protested the cancellations and called for a boycott of the network for its "institutional racism". Fox maintained that the series were low-rated and the decision to cancel was not racially motivated.

== Episodes ==
No.	Title	Directed by	Written by	Original release date
1	"Pilot"	David Trainer	Story by : Gary Murphy & Larry Strawther & Sinbad; Teleplay by : Gary Murphy & Larry Strawther & Michael Jacobs & David A. Caplan & Brian LaPan	September 16, 1993
David Bryan, a footloose and carefree bachelor, meets two orphaned children and learns the authorities will have to split them up unless someone adopts them both.
2	"The Toothfairy Has Landed"	Jim Drake	Gary Apple & Michael Carrington	September 23, 1993
L.J. objects to David telling Zana about the Tooth Fairy when she loses her milk teeth.
3	"The Par-tay"	Robert Berlinger	Sharon D. Johnson	September 30, 1993
David takes a domestic engineering course and believes that the instructor has fallen for him.
4	"Petty Larceny"	Rob Schiller	Michael J. Weithorn & Ralph Farquhar	October 7, 1993
David believes that L.J. may be stealing from him until he catches Zana stealing in the mall and realises that L.J. is lying to protect his sister.
5	"My Daughter's Keeper"	Debbie Allen	Michael Carrington & Gary Apple	October 14, 1993
Zana joins a club and learns that only light-skinned blacks are accepted.
6	"Strictly Business"	Rob Schiller	Ralph Farquhar & Michael J. Weithorn	October 21, 1993
Since L.J. has not been doing his homework assignments, he is not allowed to go to Disneyland with David's parents.
7	"David's Van"	Debbie Allen	Mike Langworthy	November 4, 1993
David has trouble parting with his beloved car in order to buy another.
8	"I Coulda Been the Man"	Debbie Allen	Calvin Brown, Jr.	November 11, 1993
David friend is a successful basketball player and he learns he could have had the same opportunity.
9	"Shades of Acceptance"	Neema Barnette	Daniel Palladino	November 18, 1993
David falls for a past love.
10	"It's My Party, I'll Cry If I Want To"	Debbie Allen	Calvin Brown, Jr.	December 9, 1993
When David is unable to get a TV character to come to Zana's party because of the cost, he creates one.
11	"Breaking the Pattern"	Chuck Vinson	Sharon D. Johnson	December 16, 1993
L.J. invites his girlfriend over when no one is home.
12	"Keep the Faith"	Debbie Allen	Gary Apple & Michael Carrington	January 6, 1994
L.J. doesn't believe in God.
13	"The Dog Episode"	Debbie Allen	Orlando Jones & Mike Langworthy	January 13, 1994
Zana wants to keep a dog after he follows her home.
14	"David Goes Skiing"	Debbie Allen	Orlando Jones	January 27, 1994
David has a hard time enjoying his annual ski vacation when the kids keep calling him at the lodge.
15	"The Mr. Science Show"	Chuck Vinson	Marc Sotkin	February 3, 1994
David takes a job on a kids TV show, much to L.J.'s objection.
16	"Black History Month"	Chuck Vinson	Tom Whedon	February 10, 1994
L.J. can't decide who to write his Black History Month essay on, and Zana volunteers to play Rosa Parks.
17	"The Telethon"	Chuck Vinson	Sharon D. Johnson	March 3, 1994
David convinces his father to coach a basketball team after he retires.
18	"Neighborhood Watch"	Chuck Vinson	Orlando Jones & Mike Langworthy	March 10, 1994
David starts a neighborhood watch.
19	"Love Lessons"	Chuck Vinson	Michael Carrington & Gary Apple	March 17, 1994
L.J. gets a bad grade in a black history class, and is tutored by his favorite teacher.
20	"Can We Talk?"	Chuck Vinson	Sharon D. Johnson	March 22, 1994
David and Clarence go on a talk show.
21	"The Family Reunion"	Chuck Vinson	Arnie Kogen	March 31, 1994
L.J. and Zana meet David's family.
22	"Adoption: Part 1"	Chuck Vinson	Mike Langworthy	April 7, 1994
L.J. and Zana's uncle want them to live with him.
23	"Adoption: Part 2"	Chuck Vinson	Orlando Jones	April 14, 1994
L.J. and Zana's uncle want them to live with him.
24	"Girls Unda Hoodz"	Howard Ritter	Story by : Gary Apple & Mike Langworthy; Teleplay by : Orlando Jones & Arnie Kogen	April 21, 1994
Zana gets her hair done and Clarence teaches L.J. how cool men drive.

== Syndication ==
The show aired in syndication on The Family Channel Monday to Thursday at 9:30 p.m. and weekend mornings at 11:30 a.m.. It also aired on Disney Channel for a short time during the mid-1990s.

== Awards and nominations ==
Year	Award	Category	Recipient	Result
1994	Young Artist Awards	Best Actor Under Ten in a Television Series or Show	Erin Davis	Nominated
1995	Nickelodeon Kids' Choice Awards	Favorite Television Actor	Sinbad	Nominated
