= This Is a Journey...Into Time =

Live album by Chuck Brown & the Soul Searchers
- Released: 1993
- Genre: Go-go; swing; jazz-funk
- Length: 61:41
- Label: Liaison; Raw Ventures; Jimco

Chuck Brown & the Soul Searchers chronology
90's Goin' Hard (1991)	This Is a Journey...Into Time (1993)	Hah Man (1994)

Professional ratings
Review scores
Source	Rating
AllMusic	3/5 stars
ARTISTdirect	3/5 stars
musicHound R&B	(3/5)
Vibe Magazine	(favorable)

This Is a Journey...Into Time is a live album released in 1993 by the Washington, D.C.–based go-go band Chuck Brown & the Soul Searchers. The album consists go-go renditions of classic jazz and swing songs performed with a go-go beat.

== Track listing ==
No.	Title	Writer(s)	Length
1.	"Wind Me Up"	Chuck Brown	3:56
2.	"Do the Right Thing/Harlem Nocturne"	Chuck Brown; Earle H. Hagen	12:56
3.	"Since I Fell for You"	Buddy Johnson	6:58
4.	"We Need Some Money"	Chuck Brown	8:46
5.	"Red Top"	Ben Kynard; Lionel Hampton	5:26
6.	"Tutu"	Marcus Miller	6:42
7.	"Stormy Monday"	T-Bone Walker	7:44
8.	"Foggy Day"	George Gershwin	6:35
9.	"One Nation"	Bennie Cowan; Greg Boyer; Greg Thomas	2:43
Total length:			61:41

== Personnel ==
- Chuck Brown – lead vocals, electric guitar
- William "Ju Ju" House – drums
- Heartbeat – congas
- Glenn Ellis –bass guitar, percussions
- Dr. Louie Oxley – electronic keyboards
- Greg Thomas – tenor saxophone
- Greg Boyer – trombone
- Bennie Cowan – trumpet
