= Maxx Kidd =

American singer-songwriter

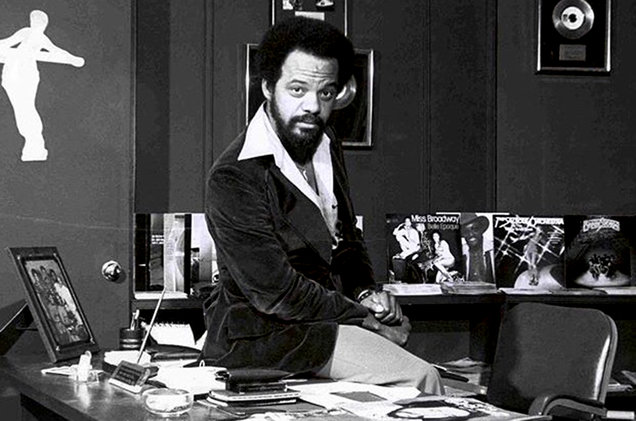

Background information
- Born: Carl Lomax Kidd; August 18, 1941; Charleston, West Virginia
- Origin: Washington, D.C.
- Died: March 13, 2017 (aged 75) Chevy Chase, Maryland
- Genres: Soul; go-go; funk; calypso
- Occupation(s): Music executive, songwriter, record producer, film producer, concert promoter
- Years active: 1960–2017
- Labels: T.T.E.D., Capitol, Curtom, Shrine

Maxx Kidd (born Carl Lomax Kidd, August 8, 1941 – March 13, 2017) was an American record producer, music promoter, film producer, and impresario based in Washington, D.C. He is regarded as one of the most significant figures in shepherding the growth of go-go music. Some of the most well-known production credits included "Blow Your Whistle" and "We Need Some Money", along with numerous other go-go songs. Additionally, Kidd has done concert promotion for numerous musical acts, such as Lou Rawls, Shalamar, The Temptations, Johnnie Taylor, Van McCoy, and The O'Jays.

== Biography ==
Maxx Kidd was born on August 8, 1941, and raised in Charleston, West Virginia. During his youth in West Virginia, he met Nat King Cole in a nightclub which was owned by his father. This encounter sparked Kidd's interest in the music industry. Thereafter, he became a calypso singer at a drive-in restaurant.

Kidd briefly served in the United States Army before relocating to Washington, D.C. in 1960. After arriving in D.C., Kidd joined soul group The Enjoyables, whose members included Keni St. Lewis, James Johnson, William Britton, Gerald Richardson, and Sidney Hall. The group released their debut single "Push a Little Harder" on Capitol Records in 1964, and the follow-up single "Shame" in 1966 on the D.C.-based label Shrine Records. Additionally, Kidd also worked with Curtis Mayfield's record label "Curtom Records", where he collaborated with Jerry Butler, Gene Chandler and Chuck Brown & the Soul Searchers. He created his own record label T.T.E.D. (the initials stood for "Tolerance, Trust, Eternal dedication, and Determination") and released numerous go-go singles and albums.

In 1992, Kidd suffered a stroke and was faced with continuing health issues for the remainder of his life. He died on March 13, 2017, in Chevy Chase, Maryland at the age of 75. Kidd was survived by five daughters, one son, eleven grandchildren, four great-grandchildren, four siblings, and a son-in-law.

== See also ==
- Go-go, (a funk subgenre of Washington, D.C.)
- Good to Go, (1985 film and soundtrack)
- Music of Washington, D.C.
