= The Spirit of Christmas (Chuck Brown album) =

Studio album by Chuck Brown
- Released: 1999
- Genre: Go-go; Christmas; soul
- Length: 48:50
- Label: Raw Venture
- Producer: Ivan Goff (exec); Chuck Brown

Chuck Brown chronology
Timeless (1998)	The Spirit of Christmas (1999)	Your Game...Live at the 9:30 Club (2001)

The Spirit of Christmas is a studio album by Washington, D.C.–based go-go musician Chuck Brown, released in 1999. This is Chuck Brown's first and only Christmas album, and features go-go renditions of nine traditional Christmas carols, including the remake of Johnny Moore's Three Blazers song "Merry Christmas, Baby".

== Track listing ==
No.	Title	Writer(s)	Length
1.	"Merry Christmas Baby"	Lou Baxter; Johnny Moore	4:55
2.	"White Christmas"	Irving Berlin	4:53
3.	"What Are You Doing New Year's Eve"	Frank Loesser	6:28
4.	"This Christmas"	Donny Hathaway; Nadine McKinnor	4:47
5.	"Silent Night"	Franz Grüber; Joseph Mohr	6:15
6.	"God Rest You Merry, Gentlemen"	English traditional Christmas carol	5:07
7.	"Have Yourself a Merry Little Christmas"	Ralph Blane; Hugh Martin	5:58
8.	"The Christmas Song" (featuring Eva Cassidy)	Mel Tormé; Robert Wells	5:33
9.	"That Spirit of Christmas" (featuring Eva Cassidy)	Parnell Davison; Mable John; Joel Webster	4:54
Total length:			48:50

== Personnel ==
- Chuck Brown – lead vocals, electric Guitar
- John M. Buchannan – keyboards, trombone
- Leroy Fleming – tenor saxophone, background vocals
- Curtis Johnson – keyboards
- Donald Tillery – trumpet, background vocals
- Ricardo D. Wellman – drums
- Rowland Smith – congas, background vocals
- Glenn Ellis – bass guitar, percussion
