= Timeless (Chuck Brown album) =

Studio album by Chuck Brown and The Second Chapter Band
- Released: April 7, 1998
- Genre: Go-go; neo soul; jazz-funk; blues
- Length: 51:42
- Label: Raw Venture
- Producer: Tom Goldfogle (exec.)

Chuck Brown and The Second Chapter Band chronology
Live P.A. Tape (1997)	Timeless (1998)	The Spirit of Christmas (1999)

Professional ratings
Review scores
Source	Rating
The Washington Post	(favorable)

Timeless is a studio album released on April 7, 1998, by the Washington, D.C.-based go-go musician Chuck Brown with The Second Chapter Band. The album was dedicated to Eva Cassidy, who died two years earlier after the sudden onset of cancer.

== Track listing ==
No.	Title	Writer(s)	Length
1.	"Nature Boy"	eden ahbez	4:31
2.	"Never Make Your Move Too Soon"	Stix Hooper; Will Jennings	4:42
3.	"I Only Have Eyes for You"	Al Dubin; Harry Warren	4:55
4.	"Wild Is the Wind"	Dimitri Tiomkin; Ned Washington	5:50
5.	"Autumn Leaves"	Joseph Kosma; Johnny Mercer Jacques Prévert	5:01
6.	"Love Won't Let Me Wait"	Vinnie Barrett; Bobby Eli	3:51
7.	"Blue Skies"	Irving Berlin	3:46
8.	"A Foggy Day"	George Gershwin; Ira Gershwin	3:41
9.	"Tenderly"	Walter Gross; Jack Lawrence	2:49
10.	"You'd Be So Nice to Come Home To"	Cole Porter	3:42
11.	"Hey There"	Richard Adler; Jerry Ross	4:36
12.	"Caravan"	Duke Ellington; Irving Mills; Juan Tizol	4:18
