= Beautiful Life (Chuck Brown album) =

Studio album by Chuck Brown
- Released: August 19, 2014
- Genre: Go-go; neo soul
- Length: 36:49
- Label: Raw Venture
- Producer: Chucky Thompson; Tom Goldfogle; James McKinney

Chuck Brown chronology
We Got This (2010)	Beautiful Life (2014)

Professional ratings
Review scores
Source	Rating
Allmusic	3/5 stars
ARTISTdirect	3/5 stars
Washington City Paper	(favorable)

Beautiful Life is the final studio album released by Washington, D.C.–based go-go musician Chuck Brown. The album was released posthumously on August 19, 2014.

== Track listing ==
No.	Title	Writer(s)	Length
1.	"Intro" (featuring Doug E. Fresh)	Doug E. Fresh	1:12
2.	"Beautiful Life" (featuring Wale)	Olubowale Akintimehin; Kevin Blackmon; Charles Brown; James McKinney; Levi Stephens	4:29
3.	"Best In Me" (featuring Raheem DeVaughn and Faith Evans)	Charles Brown; Raheem DeVaughn; Carolyn Malachi; James McKinney	4:26
4.	"Lighters" (featuring Ms. Yendy)	Kevin Blackmon; Kanja Muchoki; Carl Thompson	3:20
5.	"Pop That Trunk" (featuring Sugar Bear and K.K.)	Kevin Blackmon; Charles Brown; James McKinney	4:56
6.	"Still Crankin'" (featuring K.K.)	Kevin Blackmon; Nekos Brown; Takesha "KK" Donelson; Taylor "Airplay" Houze; Carl Thompson; Bernard Williams	3:46
7.	"Love Is My Religion" (featuring Frank Sirius)	Ziggy Marley	3:48
8.	"Oh Happy Day" (featuring Y'Anna Crawley)	Edwin Hawkins	5:58
9.	"You'll Never Find Another Love Like Mine"	Kenny Gamble & Leon Huff	4:54
Total length:			36:49
