= We're About the Business =

Studio album by Chuck Brown
- Released: April 24, 2007
- Genre: Go-go; neo soul; jazz-funk; hip-hop
- Length: 48:29
- Label: Raw Venture
- Producer: Tom Goldfogle (exec.); Carl Thompson (exec.); Aaron Phillips

Chuck Brown chronology
| Best of Chuck Brown (2005) | We're About the Business (2007) | We Got This (2010) |

Professional ratings
Review scores
| Source | Rating |
|---|---|
| The New York Times | (favorable) |
| The Washington Post | (favorable) |
| USA Today | 3.5/4 stars |
| Vibe | (favorable) |

We're About the Business is a studio album released on April 24, 2007 by the Washington, D.C.–based go-go musician Chuck Brown. We're About the Business was Chuck Brown's highest-charting album ever, which peaked on May 12, 2007, at No. 2 on the "Top R&B/Hip-Hop Albums" and No. 37 on the "Billboard Pop Albums".

== Track listing ==
| No. | Title | Length |
|---|---|---|
| 1. | "Chuck Town Intro" (featuring John Pressley) | 1:25 |
| 2. | "Love Theme" (from The Godfather) | 3:34 |
| 3. | "Block Party" (featuring Milton "Go-Go Mickey" Freeman and DJ Kool) | 4:16 |
| 4. | "Eye Candy" (featuring Raheem DeVaughn) | 5:31 |
| 5. | "Chuck Baby" (featuring KK) | 3:57 |
| 6. | "Peacemaker (Interlude)" | 0:39 |
| 7. | "Jock It In" | 3:25 |
| 8. | "Feelin' Good" | 2:47 |
| 9. | "Latin (Interlude)" | 0:12 |
| 10. | "We Come to Party" | 3:35 |
| 11. | "If You Had to Pick One (Interlude)" | 0:21 |
| 12. | "Everyday I Have the Blues" | 5:07 |
| 13. | "The Party Roll" | 3:59 |
| 14. | "Love Nationwide" | 4:31 |
| 15. | "Sound For The Town (Interlude)" | 1:18 |
| 16. | "Funky Get Down" | 4:00 |
| Total length: | | 48:29 |

== Personnel ==
- Chuck Brown – lead vocals, electric guitar
- Greg Boyer – trombone
- Brad Clements – trumpet
- DJ Kool – guest vocals
- David Dyson – bass guitar
- Vince Evans – keyboards
- Maurice "Mighty Moe" Hagans – percussion
- Roosevelt Harrell – drums
- Bryan Mills – saxophone
- "Sweet" Cherie Mitchell – keyboards, vocals
- Mark Williams – trombone

== Charts ==
=== Album ===
| Chart (2007) | Peak position |
|---|---|
| U.S. Billboard Top R&B/Hip-Hop Albums | 2 |
| U.S. Billboard Pop Albums | 37 |

=== Singles ===
| Year | Title | Chart positions | |
| Year | Title | Adult R&B Songs | Hot R&B/Hip-Hop Songs |
|---|---|---|---|
| 2007 | "Block Party" | 19 | 60 |
