= Good to Go (film) =

1986 film directed by Blaine Novak

- theatrical release poster
- Directed by: Blaine Novak
- Screenplay by: Blaine Novak
- Produced by: Chris Blackwell (exec.); Jeremy Thomas (exec.); Maxx Kidd (assoc.); Rob Fraboni (music); Doug Dilge; Sean Ferrer; Ron Downing (art)
- Starring: Art Garfunkel; Robert Doqui; Harris Yulin; Reginald Daughtry
- Cinematography: Peter Sinclair
- Edited by: Gib Jaffe; Kimberly Logan; D.C. Stringer
- Music by: Billy Goldenberg
- Distributed by: Island Visual Arts; Starmaker Video; Vidmark Entertainment
- Release dates: August 1, 1986 (Washington, D.C.)
- Running time: 90 minutes
- Country: United States
- Language: English
- Budget: $1,500,000 (estimate)

Good to Go (also titled as Short Fuse) is a 1986 crime thriller film written and directed by Blaine Novak, and stars Art Garfunkel as a beat journalist pursuing a murder investigation, with the Washington, D.C. go-go-scene in the backdrop.

== Plot ==
S.D. Blass is a beat journalist for the Washington Daily Tribune newspaper in Washington, D.C. His editor-in-chief pressures him to deliver more featured stories, as it's been too long since Blass has had a decent article printed. Blass reaches out to Matthew Harrigan, a detective for the Washington Metropolitan Police department, looking for a good story to pursue.

He learns about a nurse that was raped and murdered on her way home after working the night shift at Washington Metropolitan Hospital. Unbeknownst to Blass, the detective had fabricated the police report and placed the primary blame on go-go music and its concert goers. Blass takes the story and publishes it with the title: "Nurse Murdered at Go-Go: Music and Drugs Blamed for Violence."

Meanwhile, Max (the owner of "Maxx Saxx Entertainment") manages three of the city's top go-go bands. After fifteen years of playing at local clubs, he feels the timing is perfect to take go-go music nationally. He arranges a sit-down meeting at the Watergate complex with Gil Colton (a Los Angeles–based record producer) hoping he'll sign his artists to a recording contract. Colton loves the music and the band's energy when performing live at the local clubs. However, he's worried about all of the bad press and media attention that's associated with the live performances. Because of this, he decides not to sign the artist and heads back to L.A.

Little Beats (an up-and-coming conga player for one of Max's go-go bands) has an older brother ("Chemist") who was once a promising college student majoring in chemistry. However, he started using illegal drugs, primarily PCP (aka "Luv Boat"), and is now robbing and stealing to finance his drug addiction. He also hangs with Mr. Ain't and his street crew as they travel around the city wreaking havoc, including the rape and murder of the nurse.

Eventually, this leads to Chemist being falsely accused and charged with the murder and rape. Little Beats is apprehended by Det. Harrigan, with hopes of getting more information of Chemist's whereabouts. Blass, now aware that the detective has been fabricating many of his police reports, has chosen to disassociate himself with Harrigan. He gets in touch with Little Beats, Chemist, and their mother and works to clear Chemist of the allegations, along with exposing the police misconduct of Det. Harrigan.

== Cast ==
- Art Garfunkel as S.D. Blass
- Robert Doqui as Max
- Harris Yulin as Det. Matthew Harrigan
- Reginald Daughtry as Little Beats
- Richard Brooks as Chemist
- Richard Bauer as Editor-in-chief
- Paula Davis as Evette
- Michael White as Gil Colton
- Hattie Winston as Little Beats' Mother
- Fab Five Freddy (credited as "Fred Brathwaite") as Mr. Ain't
- Anjelica Huston as Charlemaigne

== Reception ==
Good to Go was produced with an estimated $1,500,000 budget. The film premiered on July 31, 1986, at the Warner Theatre in Washington, D.C. before being released nationally on August 1, 1986. Due to poor box office performance, the film was pulled shortly after its nationwide release. The film was repackaged under the title Short Fuse and released on VHS thereafter. The film is currently out-of-print.

== Soundtrack ==
The soundtrack was released on August 1, 1986, in conjunction with the nationwide release of the film. It consists of a compilation of 13-songs, mostly by local Washington, D.C.–based go-go bands, along with several dancehall musician. The Good to Go soundtrack was released with intentions of it becoming a springboard to elevate go-go music, similar to the way The Harder They Come soundtrack influenced the acceptance of reggae music globally.

== See also ==
- Culture of Washington, D.C.
- Music of Washington, D.C.
- List of hood films
- The Harder They Come, 1972 film
