= Go-Go & Gumbo, Satchmo N Soul =

1997 studio album by A la Carte Brass & Percussion

Studio album by A la Carte Brass & Percussion featuring Chuck Brown and Shaun Murphy
- Released: October 21, 1997
- Recorded: October 1996 – February 1997
- Studios: NALC Branch 142; Washington, D.C.
- Genres: Jazz; go-go; soul
- Length: 53:02
- Labels: Mapleshade; Wildchild
- Producers: Charlie Barnett; Pete Ostle; Gary Johnson

A la Carte Brass & Percussion featuring Chuck Brown and Shaun Murphy chronology
Boogeyin (1994)	Go-Go & Gumbo, Satchmo N Soul (1997)

Go-Go & Gumbo, Satchmo N Soul is a studio album recorded by the supergroup A la Carte Brass & Percussion featuring go-go musician Chuck Brown and blue-eyed soul singer Shaun Murphy. The album was recorded between October 1996 to February 1997, and released on October 21, 1997, by Mapleshade Records.

== Track listing ==
No.	Title	Writer(s)	Length
1.	"Ezekiel Saw the Wheel"	Chuck Brown	3:48
2.	"A Woman, a Love, and a Man"	Tony Clark	4:00
3.	"Too Many Lovers"	Denise LaSalle	5:20
4.	"Little Sunflowers"	Freddie Hubbard	5:58
5.	"Hey Pocky Way"	George Porter Jr.; Ziggy Modeliste; Art Neville; Leo Nocentelli	4:06
6.	"Standing on the Verge"	George Clinton	4:13
7.	"St. James Infirmary Blues"	Joe Primrose	3:27
8.	"San Pedro"	Nelson Rodriguez; Rob White	6:32
9.	"Me Too"	J. J. Johnson	6:42
10.	"Alligator Boogaloo"	Lou Donaldson	3:47
11.	"Lucky Old Sun"	Haven Gillespie; Harry Beasley Smith	4:31
Total length:			53:02

== Credits ==
Adapted from AllMusic

- George Allen – trombone
- Jerry Barnett – trombone
- Terry Bingham – trumpet
- Rashidi Bowe – bongos
- Chuck Brown – vocals
- John Jensen – trombone
- Karl Kalbaugh – didjeridu
- Tony Klatka – trumpet
- Tom Lepson – Hammond organ, vocals
- Alejandro Lucini – repinique, timbales
- Meta4 – vocals
- Shaun Murphy – vocals
- Vaughn Nark – trumpet
- Jack O'Dell – drums
- Nick Smith – vocals
- Nap Turner – vocals
- Esther Williams – vocals
- Chris Walker – trumpet
- Marc Weigel – trumpet
- Rob White – arranger, cajon, congas, drums, Iya, tres Golpe, wind chimes
- Pierre M. Sprey – engineer, liner notes
- Nelson Rodriguez – arranger, claves, quinto, vocals
- Larry Willis – arranger, music direction
