= The Ice Man Cometh (album) =

Studio album by Jerry Butler
- Released: November 1968
- Recorded: September 1967 – September 1968
- Studio: Sigma Sound, Philadelphia, Pennsylvania
- Genre: Soul
- Length: 30:32
- Label: Mercury
- Producer: Kenny Gamble and Leon Huff

Jerry Butler chronology
The Soul Goes On (1968)	The Ice Man Cometh (1968)	Ice on Ice (1969)

Singles from The Ice Man Cometh
- 1. "Never Give You Up" Released: April 1968; 2. "Hey, Western Union Man" Released: August 1968; 3. "Are You Happy" Released: November 1968; 4. "Only the Strong Survive" Released: February 1969

The Ice Man Cometh is the eleventh album by American singer Jerry Butler, released in 1968.

== Reception ==
Professional ratings
Review scores
Source	Rating
AllMusic	4.5/5 stars
Mojo	favorable

Reviewing for Mojo magazine, Geoff Brown describes The Ice Man Cometh as a "brilliant showcase for Butler’s often bittersweet voice", noting the production for the album by Kenny Gamble and Leon Huff as being prototypical for "the Philadelphia International sound" that would be later prominent by the 1970s.

Writing for AllMusic, John Bush rated the album four and a half stars and also noted Gamble and Huff's production as "the first time R&B production techniques reached a level of maturity and elegance", describing Butler as "one of the smoothest vocalists in soul history".

== Track listing ==
All tracks composed by Jerry Butler, Kenneth Gamble and Leon Huff; except where indicated.

1. "Hey, Western Union Man" - 2:41
2. "Can't Forget About You, Baby" (Butler, Gamble) - 2:40
3. "Only the Strong Survive" - 2:38
4. "How Can I Get in Touch with You" - 2:28
5. "Just Because I Really Love You" - 2:38
6. "Lost" - 2:40
7. "Never Give You Up" - 2:59
8. "Are You Happy" (Gamble, Thom Bell, Butler) - 2:41
9. "(Strange) I Still Love You" (Butler, Mikki Farrow, Harris) - 2:53
10. "Go Away - Find Yourself" - 2:53
11. "I Stop by Heaven" - 3:21

== Production credits ==
- Bobby Martin - Arranger
- Thom Bell - Arranger
- Roland Chambers - Arranger
- Joe Tarsia - Engineer
- Jay Thompson - photography

== Charts ==
Billboard

Year	Chart	Peak
1969	R&B Albums	2
1969	Pop Albums	29
