= Funk Express =

Album by Chuck Brown

Studio album by Chuck Brown & the Soul Searchers
- Released: 1980
- Genre: Go-go; jazz-funk
- Length: 40:40
- Label: Source Records
- Producer: Joe Fontana (exec); Wayne Henderson

Chuck Brown & the Soul Searchers chronology
Bustin' Loose (1979)	Funk Express (1980)	Go Go Swing Live (1986)

Professional ratings
Review scores
Source	Rating
AllMusic	3/5 stars
ARTISTdirect	3/5 stars
Robert Christgau	B+

Funk Express is a studio album released in 1980 by the Washington, D.C.–based go-go band Chuck Brown & the Soul Searchers.

== Track listing ==
Side A

1. "Come On and Boogie" (Part I - Vocal) – 4:56
2. "Come On and Boogie" (Part II - A Fantasy of Fusion) – 4:56
3. "In the Pocket" – 6:08
4. "Who Are You" – 3:20

Side B

1. "Sticks and Stones" – 6:04
2. "Time Has No Ending" – 3:49
3. "Slow Down (You Keep Telling Me)" – 4:32
4. "Keep That Same Old Feeling" – 6:55

== Personnel ==
- Chuck Brown – lead vocals, electric guitar
- Jerry Wilder – bass guitar
- Gregory Gerran – congas, percussion
- Ricardo D. Wellman – drums
- Leroy Fleming – tenor saxophone, flute, timbales, background vocals
- Skip Fennell – keyboards
- Curtis Johnson – organ, keyboards
- John M. Buchannan – keyboards, trombone
- Donald Tillery – trumpet, background vocals
