= Hah Man =

Studio album by Chuck Brown
- Released: 1994
- Genre: Go-go; swing; jazz-funk
- Length: 48:56
- Label: Raw Ventures

Chuck Brown chronology
This Is a Journey...Into Time (1993)	Hah Man (1994)	The Other Side (1995)

Professional ratings
Review scores
Source	Rating
AllMusic	3/5 stars
ARTISTdirect	2.5/5 stars

Hah Man is a studio album released in 1994 by the Washington, D.C.–based go-go musician Chuck Brown. The album consists go-go renditions of classic jazz and swing songs performed with a go-go beat. The album's title track "Hah Man" was used as the theme song to the television show The Sinbad Show, a 1993 to 1994 black sitcom starring comedian Sinbad.

== Track listing ==
No.	Title	Writer(s)	Length
1.	"My Funny Valentine/I Can Make You Go Oooh"	Heavy D; Lorenz Hart; Richard Rodgers; Howie Tee	6:46
2.	"The End of a Love Affair"	Edward Redding	5:23
3.	"Man Smart (Woman Smarter)"	Norman Span	4:58
4.	"Hah Man (Sinbad, Main Title)"	Chuck Brown	5:19
5.	"Saturday Night Fish Fry"	Louis Jordan; Ellis Walsh	5:22
6.	"Busy Enuf"	Chuck Brown	5:29
7.	"Save Your Love for Me"	Buddy Johnson; Etta Jones	5:23
8.	"A Night in Tunisia"	Dizzy Gillespie; Frank Paparelli	5:17
9.	"My Funny Valentine"	Lorenz Hart; Richard Rodgers	4:59
Total length:			48:56

== Personnel ==
- Chuck Brown – lead vocal, lead guitar
- Glenn Ellis – bass guitar
- Rick Wellman – drums
- Louie Oxley – keyboards
- Leigh Pilzer – saxophone
- Doug Elliott – trombone
- Chris Walker – trumpet
- Kent Wood – percussion, keyboards

== See also ==
- The Sinbad Show
