= Bustin' Loose (song) =

Single by Chuck Brown & the Soul Searchers

from the album Bustin' Loose
- A-side: "Bustin' Loose Part I"
- B-side: "Bustin' Loose Part II"
- Released: October 1978
- Recorded: 1978
- Studio: Sigma Sound, Philadelphia, Pennsylvania
- Genre: Go-go
- Length: 3:52 (Part 1); 4:35 (Part 2)
- Label: Source
- Songwriter: Charles Brown
- Producer: James Purdie

Chuck Brown & the Soul Searchers singles chronology
"If It Ain't Funky" (1978)	"Bustin' Loose" (1978)	"Never Gonna Give You Up" (1979)

"Bustin' Loose (Part 1)" is a hit song for Chuck Brown & the Soul Searchers. Released from the album of the same name, it spent four weeks at the top of the R&B singles chart in early 1979 and peaked at number 34 on the Billboard Hot 100 singles chart.

== Popular culture ==
- "Bustin' Loose" is currently played after the first home run the Washington Nationals hit in each game at Nationals Park. In the past it was played after every home run, with the exception of the 2015 and 2016 seasons, when the Jessie J song "Bang Bang" was played.
- It's been the victory song for the Washington Capitals and the Washington Wizards.
- It can be heard in the "Treehouse of Horror XXVIII" episode of The Simpsons, when Homer Simpson cannibalizes himself.
- The Nelly song "Hot in Herre" contains an interpolation of "Bustin' Loose".
- The song is featured in the video game Driver Parallel Lines.
- In season 3 episode 1 of The Deuce, the song can be heard in the final scene.
- It played during the intro of the movie The Honeymooners, starring Cedric the Entertainer.
