= Ashley's Roachclip =

1974 instrumental by the Soul Searchers

Instrumental by the Soul Searchers

from the album Salt of the Earth
- Released: 1974
- Genre: Funk
- Length: 5:36
- Label: Sussex
- Composer: Lloyd Pinchback
- Producers: Carroll Hynson; Joe Tate

"Ashley's Roachclip" is an instrumental by funk group the Soul Searchers from the 1974 album Salt of the Earth on Sussex Records. Saxophonist Lloyd Pinchback is credited for composition. A portion of the track from 3:30 to 3:50 contains a widely recognized drum break performed by Kenneth Scoggins, that has been sampled countless times in songs across several genres.

Among the most popular songs that have sampled the drum break are "Paid in Full" by Eric B. & Rakim, "Hey Young World" by Slick Rick, "Run's House" by Run-DMC, "Set Adrift on Memory Bliss" by P.M. Dawn, "Girl You Know It's True" by Milli Vanilli and "Unbelievable" by EMF.
