= Chuck Brown =

American go-go musician (1936–2012)

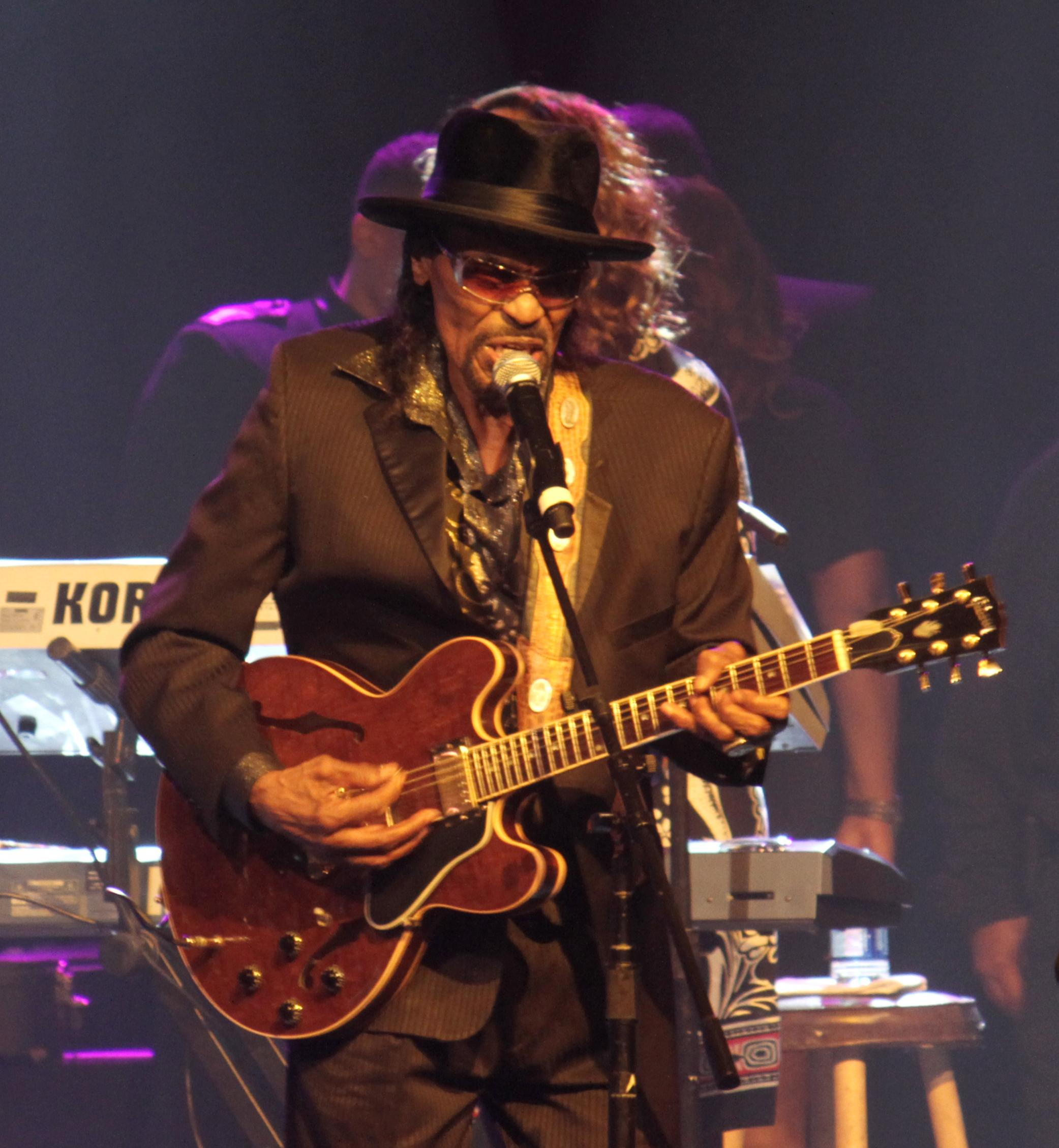
- Brown performing in 2011
- Born: Charles Louis Brown; August 22, 1936; Gaston, North Carolina, U.S.
- Died: May 16, 2012 (aged 75); Baltimore, Maryland, U.S.
- Other name: The Godfather of Go-Go
- Occupations: Singer; musician; songwriter; record producer; guitarist
- Musical career
- Origin: Washington, D.C., U.S.
- Genres: Go-go; funk; swing; hip hop; neo soul; jazz-funk; blues
- Instrument: Guitar
- Years active: 1960s–2012
- Formerly of: The Soul Searchers
- Website: windmeupchuck.com

Charles Louis Brown (August 22, 1936 – May 16, 2012) was an American guitarist, bandleader, and singer known as "The Godfather of Go-Go". Go-go is a subgenre of funk music developed around the Washington, D.C., area in the mid-1970s. While its musical classification, influences, and origins are debated, Brown is regarded as the fundamental force behind the creation of go-go music.

At the time of his death, he was still performing music and was well known in the Washington, D.C., area. The song "Ashley's Roachclip" from the 1974 album Salt of the Earth by Brown's band The Soul Searchers contains a drum break, sampled countless times in various other tracks. Brown's R&B hits include "Bustin' Loose"(1979) and "We Need Some Money"(1984).

== Early life: 1936–1963 ==
Brown was born on August 22, 1936, in Gaston, North Carolina. Brown's mother, Lyla Brown, was a housekeeper. His father, Albert Louis Moody, was a United States Marine. Brown's father, however, was not present in his life, and Brown lived in poverty. When Brown was six years old, he moved to Washington, D.C., and at 15 he started living on the streets. He did not graduate high school; after quitting school he decided to perform odd jobs to make money, including shining shoes.

In the 1950s, Brown was convicted of murder and served eight years in Lorton Correctional Complex. At first, the case was tried as aggravated assault; however, it was moved up to murder once the victim died. Brown stated that his actions were in self-defense. In prison, he traded cigarettes for a guitar, which was how his love for the instrument began. When Brown completed his sentence, he moved back to Washington, D.C., and worked as a truck driver, a bricklayer, and a sparring partner at multiple boxing gyms. He also started to perform at parties throughout the area; however, he could not play at venues that served liquor because his probation officer would not allow it.

== Music career ==
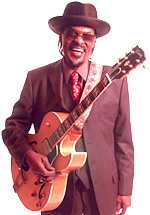
Brown with his signature blonde Gibson ES-175

Brown's musical career began in the 1960s, playing guitar with many jazz musicians and soul singer Jerry Butler, joining Los Latinos in 1965.

Brown also recorded go-go covers of early jazz and blues songs, such as "Go-Go Swing", "Harlem Nocturne", Duke Ellington's "It Don't Mean a Thing If It Ain't Got That Swing", "Moody's Mood For Love", Johnny Mercer's "Midnight Sun", Louis Jordan's "Run Joe", and T-Bone Walker's "Stormy Monday".

In the mid-1990s, he performed the theme music of Fox's sitcom The Sinbad Show which later aired on The Family Channel and Disney Channel. "Bustin' Loose" has been adopted by the Washington Nationals baseball team as its home run celebration song and was interpolated by Nelly for his 2002 number one hit "Hot in Herre."

He received his first Grammy Award nomination in 2011 for Best R&B Performance By A Duo Or Group With Vocals for "Love" (with Jill Scott and Marcus Miller), from the album We Got This.

== Death and tributes ==
Brown died on May 16, 2012, at Baltimore's Johns Hopkins Hospital of multiple organ failure, including heart failure, at the age of 75. Several weeks before his death, he had postponed and canceled shows due to hospitalization for pneumonia. His interment was at Trinity Memorial Gardens in Waldorf, Maryland.

"Chuck [Brown] was like the Washington Monument. He was like Ben's Chili Bowl. He was the big chair. He was all of that. Chuck Brown was Washington, D.C. [...] People feel you when it's genuine, and Chuck was always that."

— Donnie Simpson, Washington, D.C., radio and television personality

The Soul Rebels Brass Band, Rare Essence and Slick Rick performed a tribute concert and collaborated on June 21, 2012, in Washington, D.C., at the historic Howard Theatre which re-opened in April 2012.

=== Artistry and legacy ===
Brown played a blonde Gibson ES-335.

Brown is called the "Godfather of Go-Go" and was considered a local legend in Washington, D.C. Darryl Brooks, a local promoter who worked with Chuck Brown during his career, stated, "He was a symbol of D.C. manhood, back in the day, because of the authority that he spoke with. He just spoke from a perspective that black men could understand." Andre Johnson, the leader of the go-go band Rare Essence, said that Chuck Brown "influenced generations of people—not just one—a few generations of musicians around here." Vincent C. Gray, the mayor of Washington, D.C., said Brown was "go-go's creator and, arguably, its most legendary artist".

He influenced other go-go bands such as Trouble Funk, Experience Unlimited (EU), Rare Essence, Hot Cold Sweat, Junk Yard Band, AM/FM, Slug-Go, Redds & the Boys, Anwan Glover, the Backyard Band, and Little Benny and the Masters.

== Awards and honors ==
Brown was a recipient of a 2005 National Heritage Fellowship awarded by the National Endowment for the Arts, which is the United States' highest honor in the folk and traditional arts.

In 2009, the 1900 block of 7th Street NW, in Northwest Washington, D.C., between Florida Avenue and T Street, was renamed Chuck Brown Way in his honor.

On September 4, 2011, Brown was honored by the National Symphony Orchestra, as the NSO paid tribute to Legends of Washington Music Labor Day concert - honoring Brown's music, as well as Duke Ellington and John Philip Sousa - with a free concert on the West Lawn of the Capitol. Brown and his band capped off the evening with a performance.

In 2014, the Chuck Brown Memorial Park in Langdon neighborhood, Washington, D.C., was built to honor Brown. It features a memorial wall honoring his life and achievements, as well as a sculpture called "Wind Me Up, Chuck", signifying the "call and response" associated with go-go music.

In 2025, Republican members of the House of Representatives rejected a bill introduced by Representative Eleanor Holmes Norton to name a post office in D.C. after Brown. They cited his murder conviction as why his name should not be used.

== Discography ==
=== Studio albums ===
- We the People (1972)
- Salt of the Earth (1974)
- Bustin' Loose (1979)
- Funk Express (1980)
- We Need Some Money (1984)
- The Other Side (featuring Eva Cassidy) (1992)
- Hah Man (1994)
- Go-Go & Gumbo, Satchmo N Soul (1997)
- Timeless (1998)
- The Spirit of Christmas (1999)
- We're About the Business (2007)
- We Got This (2010)
- Beautiful Life (2014)

=== Live albums ===
- Go Go Swing Live (1986)
- Any Other Way to Go? (1987)
- Live '87 – D.C. Bumpin' Y'all (1987)
- 90's Goin' Hard (1991)
- This Is a Journey...Into Time (1993)
- Your Game...Live at the 9:30 Club (2001)
- Put Your Hands Up! (2002)

=== Compilation albums ===
- Go-Go Crankin' (1985)
- Good to Go (1986)
- Go Go Live at the Capital Centre (1987)
- The Go Go Posse (1988)
- Let's Go Go Christmas (1995)
- Greatest Hits (1998)
- Best of Chuck Brown (2005)
