= Jerry Butler =

American soul singer and songwriter (1939–2025)

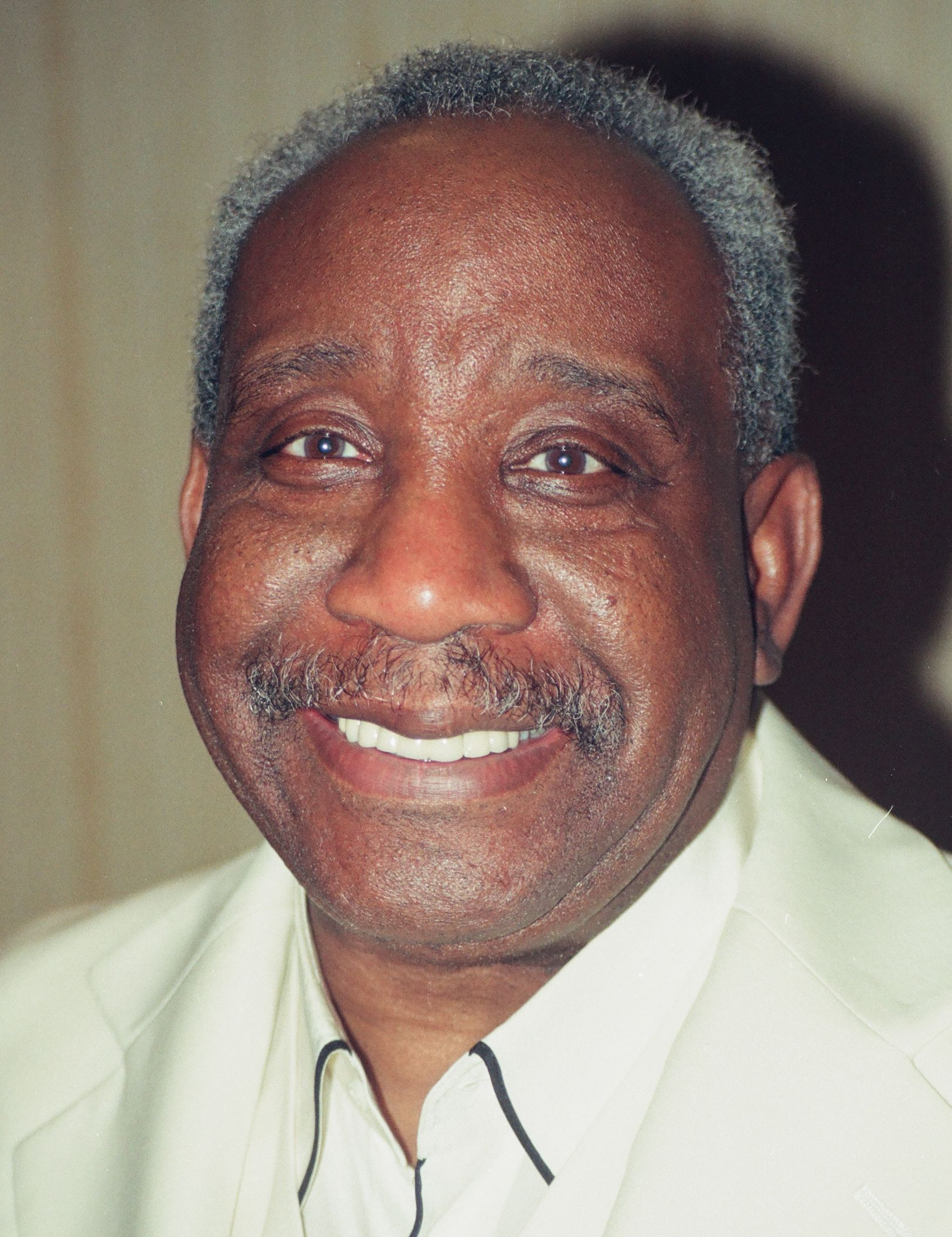
- Butler in 1998

Member of the Cook County Board of Commissioners from the 3rd district
- In office 1994–2018
- Preceded by: constituency established
- Succeeded by: Bill Lowry

Member of the Cook County Board of Commissioners from Chicago
- In office 1986–1994

Personal details
- Born: December 8, 1939 Sunflower, Mississippi, U.S.
- Died: February 20, 2025 (aged 85) Chicago, Illinois, U.S.
- Party: Democratic
- Spouse: Annette Butler (m. 1959; died 2019)
- Children: 4
- Occupation: Singer-songwriter; Record producer; Multi-instrumentalist; Politician
- Awards: Rock and Roll Hall of Fame (1991)
- Musical career
- Also known as: The Ice Man
- Genres: R&B; soul; Chicago soul; Philadelphia soul
- Instruments: Vocals; guitar; bass; saxophone; piano; drums
- Years active: 1958–2018
- Labels: Abner; Vee-Jay; Mercury; Motown; Rhino
- Formerly of: The Impressions

Jerry Butler Jr. (December 8, 1939 – February 20, 2025) was an American soul singer-songwriter, producer, musician, and politician. He was the original lead singer of the R&B vocal group the Impressions, who were inducted into the Rock and Roll Hall of Fame in 1991. After leaving the group in 1960, Butler achieved over 55 Billboard Pop and R&B Chart hits as a solo artist including "He Will Break Your Heart," "Let It Be Me," and "Only the Strong Survive." He was inducted into the National Rhythm & Blues Hall of Fame in 2015.

Butler served as a Commissioner for Cook County, Illinois, from 1985 to 2018. As a member of the 17-member county government board, he chaired the Health and Hospitals Committee and served as Vice Chair of the Construction Committee.

== Biography ==
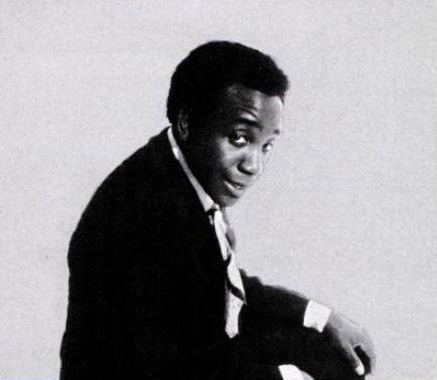
Jerry Butler in 1970

=== Early life ===
Butler was born in Sunflower, Mississippi, United States, on December 8, 1939. When Butler was three years old, the family moved to Chicago, Illinois, and he grew up in the Cabrini–Green housing projects. The mid-1950s had a profound effect on Butler's life. He performed in a church choir with Curtis Mayfield. As a teenager, Butler sang in a gospel quartet called Northern Jubilee Gospel Singers, along with Mayfield. Mayfield, a guitar player, became the lone instrumentalist for the six-member Roosters group, which later became The Impressions. Inspired by Sam Cooke and the Soul Stirrers, the Five Blind Boys of Mississippi, and the Pilgrim Travelers, getting into the music industry seemed inevitable.

Butler's younger brother, Billy Butler, also had a career in the music industry, including playing guitar with Jerry's band, until his death in 2015.

=== Early recordings ===
Butler co-wrote the song "For Your Precious Love" (which is ranked number 327 on the Rolling Stone magazine's list of The 500 Greatest Songs of All Time) and wanted to record a disc. Looking for recording studios, the Impressions (the original members of which were Butler, Curtis Mayfield, Sam Gooden, Fred Cash − who left early on, and later returned − and brothers Arthur and Richard Brooks), auditioned for Chess Records and Vee-Jay Records. The group eventually signed with Vee-Jay, where they released "For Your Precious Love" in 1958. It became The Impressions' first hit and gold record.

=== Solo career ===
Butler was first given the nickname "Iceman" by WDAS Philadelphia disc jockey, Georgie Woods, while performing in a Philadelphia theater. He released the single "He Will Break Your Heart" in 1960, and the song peaked at number 7 on the Billboard pop chart. Butler co-wrote, with Otis Redding, the latter's hit song "I've Been Loving You Too Long" in 1965. Butler's solo career saw a string of hits, including the Top 10 successes "He Will Break Your Heart," "Find Another Girl," "I'm A-Telling You" (all co-written by fellow Impression Curtis Mayfield and featuring Mayfield as harmony vocal), the million selling "Only the Strong Survive," "Moon River," "Need To Belong" (recorded with the Impressions after he went solo), "Make It Easy on Yourself," "Let It Be Me" (with Betty Everett), "Brand New Me," "Ain't Understanding Mellow" (with Brenda Lee Eager), "Hey, Western Union Man," and "Never Give You Up."

His 1969 "Moody Woman" release became a Northern Soul favourite and featured at number 369 in the Northern Soul Top 500. Butler released two successful albums, The Ice Man Cometh (1968) and Ice on Ice (1969). He collaborated on many of his successful recordings with the Philadelphia-based songwriting team of Gamble and Huff. In 1972, he had a small role in the cult classic film The Thing with Two Heads as a prison guard. With Motown, in 1976 and 1977, Butler produced and co-produced (with Paul David Wilson) two albums: Suite for the Single Girl and It All Comes Out in My Song.

In 1975, the pop group Tony Orlando and Dawn covered Butler's 1960 song "He Will Break Your Heart," with a new title, "He Don't Love You (Like I Love You)," and it was more successful than Butler's original (number 7), peaking at number one on the US Billboard Hot 100.

=== 1980s–2018 ===
Butler continued to perform while serving as a Cook County Board Commissioner from 1985, before retiring from public office in 2018. As Cook County Commissioner, Butler voted to uphold a historic 2008 Cook County sales tax increase, which remains the highest in the nation. As a result, the Chicago Tribune encouraged people to vote against him in the 2010 elections. Butler, however, won reelection in March 2014 with over 80 percent of the vote.

He later served as host of PBS TV music specials such as Doo Wop 50 and 51, Rock Rhythm and Doo Wop, and Soul Spectacular: 40 years of R&B, among others. He also served as chairman of the board of the Rhythm and Blues Foundation. In 1991, Butler was inducted, along with the other original members of the Impressions (Curtis Mayfield, Sam Gooden, Fred Cash, and Arthur and Richard Brooks), into the Rock and Roll Hall of Fame. Butler released Time & Faith in 1992.

The Hives covered "Find Another Girl" on their 2000 album Veni Vidi Vicious. The Black Keys covered "Never Give You Up" on their 2010 album, Brothers.

=== Personal life and death ===
His wife Annette, originally one of his backup singers, died in 2019. The couple had twin sons, Randall and Anthony.

After his 1991 induction into the Rock and Roll Hall of Fame as a member of the Impressions, some music writers and critics stated that Butler also deserved a second induction as a solo artist, based upon his successful career as a recording artist and songwriter after leaving that group.

Butler died from the effects of Parkinson's disease at his home in Chicago, on February 20, 2025, at the age of 85.

== Discography ==
=== Charted albums ===
Year	Album	Peak positions		Label
Year	Album	US 200	US CB	Label
1967	Mr. Dream Merchant	154	—	Mercury
1968	Golden Hits Live	178	—	Mercury
1968	The Soul Goes On	195	98	Mercury
1968	The Ice Man Cometh	29	34	Mercury
1969	Ice On Ice	41	64	Mercury
1970	The Best of Jerry Butler	167	—	Mercury
1970	You & Me	172	—	Mercury
1971	Assorted Sounds	186	—	Mercury
1971	Sagittarius Movement	123	101	Mercury
1971	Gene & Jerry - One & One (with Gene Chandler)	143	—	Mercury
1972	The Spice of Life	92	92	
1977	The Vintage Years	199	—	Sire
1977	Suite for the Single Girl	146	—	Motown
1977	Thelma & Jerry (with Thelma Houston)	53	—	Motown
1979	Nothing Says I Love You Like I Love You	160	—	Phil

=== Singles ===
Year	Single (A-side, B-side)	Chart positions				Album
Year	Single (A-side, B-side)	US	US R&B	US AC	CAN (CHUM RPM)	Album
1958	"For Your Precious Love" b/w "Sweet Was the Wine" (from He Will Break Your Heart); Both tracks with The Impressions	11	3	—	18	Jerry Butler, esq.
1958	"Come Back My Love" b/w "Love Me" (from Aware of Love); Both tracks with The Impressions	—	29	—	—	Jerry Butler, esq.
1959	"Lost" b/w "One By One" (from Aware of Love)	—	17	—	—	Jerry Butler, esq.
1959	"I Was Wrong" b/w "Couldn't Go to Sleep" (from Aware of Love)	—	—	—	—	Jerry Butler, esq.
1960	"A Lonely Soldier" b/w "I Found a Love"	—	25	—	—	He Will Break Your Heart
1960	"He Will Break Your Heart" b/w "Thanks to You"	7	1	—	9	He Will Break Your Heart
1960	"Silent Night" b/w "O Holy Night"	—	—	—	—	Non-album tracks
1961	"Find Another Girl" b/w "When Trouble Calls"	27	10	—	13	Aware of Love
1961	"I'm a Telling You" b/w "I See a Fool"	25	8	—	—	Aware of Love
1961	"Moon River"	11	14	3	14	Need to Belong
1961	"Aware of Love"	105	—	—	—	Aware of Love
1962	"Isle of Sirens" b/w "Chi Town" (from Jerry Butler, esq.)	—	—	—	—	Need to Belong
1962	"Make It Easy on Yourself" b/w "It's Too Late" (non-album track)	20	18	—	—	Need to Belong
1962	"You Can Run (But You Can't Hide)" b/w "I'm the One" (non-album track)	63	23	—		Need to Belong
1962	"Theme from Taras Bulba (The Wishing Star)" b/w "You Go Right Through Me" (from Jerry Butler, esq.)	100	—	—	—	Non-album track
1963	"Whatever You Want" b/w '"You Won't Be Sorry" (Non-album track)	68	—	—	—	Need to Belong
1963	"I Almost Lost My Mind" b/w "Strawberries" (from Need to Belong)	—	—	—	—	Non-album track
1963	"Where's the Girl" b/w "How Beautifully You Lie"	—	—	—	—	Need to Belong
1963	"A Woman With Soul" b/w "Just a Little Bit" (from More of the Best of Jerry Butler)	—	—	—	—	Non-album track
1963	"Need to Belong" b/w "Give Me Your Love" (from He Will Break Your Heart)	31	*	—	—	Need to Belong
1964	"Giving Up on Love" b/w "I've Been Trying" (non-album track)	56	*	—	—	Need to Belong
1964	"I Stand Accused"	61	*	—	—	More of the Best of Jerry Butler
1964	"I Don't Want to Hear It Anymore"	95	*	—	—	More of the Best of Jerry Butler
1964	"Let It Be Me" (with Betty Everett) /	5	*	—	28	Delicious Together
1964	"Ain't That Lovin' You, Baby" (with Betty Everett)	108	*	—	—	Delicious Together
1964	"Smile" b/w "Love Is Strange" (from Delicious Together); Both tracks with Betty Everett	42	*	—	—	More of the Best of Jerry Butler
1965	"Good Times" b/w "I've Grown Accustomed to Her Face"	64	33	—	—	Non-album tracks
1965	"Since I Don't Have You" b/w "Just Be True"; Both tracks with Betty Everett	—	—	—	—	Delicious Together
1965	"I Can't Stand to See You Cry" b/w "Nobody Needs Your Love (More Than I Do)"	122	—	—	—	Non-album tracks
1965	"Just for You" b/w "Believe in Me" (from The Impressions With Jerry Butler)	—	33	—	—	Non-album tracks
1966	"For Your Precious Love" (re-recording) b/w "Give It Up" (non-album track)	—	25	—	—	Love Me
1966	"Love (Oh, How Sweet It Is)" b/w "Loneliness" (from The Best of Jerry Butler (Mercury))	103	34	—	—	Non-album tracks
1966	"You Make Me Feel Like Someone" b/w "For What You Made of Me"	—	—	—	—	Non-album tracks
1966	"I Dig You Baby" b/w "Some Kinda Magic"	60	8	—	—	Soul Artistry
1967	"You Walked Into My Life" b/w "Why Did I Lose You"	—	—	—	—	Soul Artistry
1967	"You Don't Know What You Got Until You Lose It" b/w "The Way I Love You (Nobody Ever Loved Anybody)" (from Mr. Dream Merchant)	—	—	—	—	Soul Artistry
1967	"Mr. Dream Merchant" b/w "Cause I Love You So" (Non-album track)	38	23	—	45	Mr. Dream Merchant
1967	"Lost" b/w "You Don't Know What You Got Until You Lose It" (from Soul Artistry)	62	48	—	—	Mr. Dream Merchant
1968	"Never Give You Up" b/w "Beside You" (from Mr. Dream Merchant)	20	7	—	16	The Ice Man Cometh
1968	"Hey, Western Union Man" b/w "Just Can't Forget About You"	16	1	—	15	The Ice Man Cometh
1968	"Are You Happy" b/w "(Strange) I Still Love You"	39	9	—	19	The Ice Man Cometh
1969	"Only the Strong Survive" b/w "Just Because I Really Love You"	4	1	—	4	The Ice Man Cometh
1969	"Moody Woman" b/w "Go Away, Find Yourself" (from The Ice Man Cometh)	24	3	—	17	Ice On Ice
1969	"What's the Use of Breaking Up" /	20	4	—	25	Ice On Ice
1969	"A Brand New Me"	109	—	—	—	Ice On Ice
1969	"Don't Let Love Hang You Up" b/w "Walking Around in Teardrops"	44	12	—	44	Ice On Ice
1970	"Got to See If I Can Get Mommy (To Come Back Home)" b/w "I Forgot to Remember"	62	21	—	—	Ice On Ice
1970	"I Could Write a Book" b/w "Since I Lost You Lady" (from Ice on Ice)	46	15	—	48	You & Me
1970	"Where Are You Going" b/w "You Can Fly"	95	42	—	—	"Joe" -- Original Soundtrack
1970	"Special Memory" b/w "How Does It Feel"	109	36	—	—	Assorted Sounds with the Aid of Assorted Friends and Relatives
1971	"You Just Can't Win (By Making the Same Mistakes)" b/w "Sho Is Grooving"; Both tracks by Gene (Chandler) & Jerry (Butler)	94	32	—	—	Gene & Jerry -- One & One
1971	"Ten and Two (Take This Woman Off the Corner)" b/w "Everybody Is Waiting"; Both tracks by Gene (Chandler) & Jerry (Butler)	126	44	—	—	Gene & Jerry -- One & One
1971	"If It's Real What I Feel" b/w "Why Are You Leaving Me"	69	8	—	—	Assorted Sounds with the Aid of Assorted Friends and Relatives
1971	"Ain't Understanding Mellow" (with Brenda Lee Eager) b/w "Windy City Soul"	21	3	—	—	The Sagittarius Movement
1971	"How Did We Lose It Baby" b/w "Do You Finally Need a Friend"	85	38	—	—	Assorted Sounds with the Aid of Assorted Friends and Relatives
1971	"Walk Easy My Son" b/w "Let Me Be"	93	33	—	—	The Sagittarius Movement
1972	"I Only Have Eyes for You" b/w "A Prayer"	85	20	—	—	The Spice Of Life
1972	"Close to You" b/w "You Can't Always Tell"; Both tracks with Brenda Lee Eager	91	6	—	—	The Spice Of Life
1972	"One Night Affair" b/w "Life's Unfortunate Sons" (from You & Me)	52	6	—	—	The Spice Of Life
1973	"Can't Understand It" b/w "How Long Will It Last"; Both sides with Brenda Lee Eager	—	26	—	—	The Love We Have, The Love We Had
1973	"The Love We Had Stays on My Mind" b/w "Were We Lovers, Were We Friends"; Both tracks with Brenda Lee Eager	—	64	—	—	The Love We Have, The Love We Had
1973	"Power of Love" b/w "What Do You Do on a Sunday Afternoon"	—	15	—	—	Power of Love
1974	"That's How Heartaches Are Made" b/w "Too Many Danger Signs"	—	58	—	—	Power of Love
1974	"Take The Time to Tell Her" b/w "High Stepper"	—	46	—	—	Sweet Sixteen
1974	"Playing On You" b/w "You and Me Against the World"	—	33	—	—	Sweet Sixteen
1976	"The Devil in Mrs. Jones" b/w "I Don't Wanna Be Reminded"	—	55	—	—	Love's on the Menu
1977	"I Wanna Do It To You" b/w "I Don't Wanna Be Reminded" (from Love's on the Menu)	51	7	—	—	Suite for the Single Girl
1977	"Chalk It Up" b/w "I Don't Want Nobody to Know" (from Love's on the Menu)	—	28	—	—	Suite for the Single Girl
1977	"It's a Lifetime Thing" b/w "Kiss Me Now" (Non-album track); Both tracks with Thelma Houston)	—	55	—	—	Thelma & Jerry
1978	"(I'm Just Thinking About) Cooling Out" b/w "Are You Lonely Tonight"	—	14	—	—	Nothing Says I Love You Like I Love You
1979	"Nothing Says I Love You Like I Love You" b/w "I'm Glad to Be Back"	—	86	—	—	Nothing Says I Love You Like I Love You
1979	"Let's Make Love" b/w "Dream World"	—	—	—	—	Nothing Says I Love You Like I Love You
1980	"The Best Love I Ever Had" b/w "Would You Mind"	—	49	—	—	The Best Love
1980	"Don't Be an Island" (with Debra Henry) b/w "The Best Love I Ever Had" (Slow version)	—	75	—	—	The Best Love
1982	"No Love Without Changes" b/w "All the Way"	—	83	—	—	Ice 'N Hot
1983	"In My Life" (with Patti Austin); B-side by Patti Austin: "What's At the End of a Rainbow"	—	92	—	—	Non-album track
"—" denotes releases that did not chart or were not released. * denotes that the R&B chart did not publish during the chart runs of these singles.

== See also ==
- List of soul musicians
- R&B number-one hits of 1960 (USA)
- R&B number-one hits of 1961 (USA)
- R&B number-one hits of 1968 (USA)
- R&B number-one hits of 1969 (USA)

== Bibliography ==
- Pruter, Robert (1991). Chicago Soul. Urbana, IL: University of Illinois Press. ISBN 978-0-252-06259-9.
