= Salt of the Earth (The Soul Searchers album) =

Studio album by The Soul Searchers
- Released: 1974
- Recorded: 1974
- Studios: American Star Studio, Falls Church, Virginia
- Genres: Soul; jazz-funk; go-go
- Length: 40:34
- Label: Sussex
- Producers: Carroll Hynson; Joe Tate

The Soul Searchers chronology
We the People (1972)	Salt of the Earth (1974)	Bustin' Loose (1979)

Salt of the Earth is the second album by the Washington, D.C.–based group The Soul Searchers.

== Reception ==
Professional ratings
Review scores
Source	Rating
AllMusic	4/5 stars
ARTISTdirect	4/5 stars

Released in 1974, this album has become one of the most sampled albums in hip-hop music with the drum break from "Ashley's Roachclip" being the basis of many popular songs of the past thirty years.

== Track listing ==
Side A

1. "I Rolled It You Hold It" (John Buchanan) – 4:38
2. "Blow Your Whistle" (Maxx Kidd, Chuck Brown) – 3:01
3. "Close To You" (Burt Bacharach, Hal David) – 4:23
4. "Funk to the Folks" (John Buchanan) – 4:14

Side B

1. "Ain't It Heavy" (John Buchanan) – 5:58
2. "Windsong" (John Buchanan) – 5:00
3. "Ashley's Roachclip" (Lloyd Pinchback) – 5:36
4. "We Share" (Donald Tillery, John Buchanan) – 2:49
5. "If It Ain't Funky" (Chuck Brown) – 3:39

== Personnel ==
The Soul Searchers

- Chuck Brown – electric guitar, lead vocals
- John "J.B." Buchanan – trombone, piano, synthesizer, percussion, vocals
- Donald Tillery – trumpet, percussion, vocals
- John Euwell – bass guitar
- Kenneth Scoggins – drums, percussion
- Lino Druitt – congas, bongos, percussion
- Lloyd Pinchback – flute, saxophone, percussion
- Bennie Braxton – organ, vocals

Technical

- Carl Overr – art direction
- Ed Mell – cover illustration

== Samples ==
- Eric B. & Rakim sampled "Ashley's Roachclip" on their song "Paid In Full" on their album Paid In Full in 1987.
- LL Cool J sampled "Ashley's Roachclip" on his song "Jack The Ripper" on the B-Side of his 12" "Going Back to Cali" single in 1988, which also appeared as a bonus track on his 1989 album Walking with a Panther.
- Run–D.M.C. sampled "Ashley's Roachclip" on their song "Run's House" on their album Tougher Than Leather in 1988.
- Public Enemy sampled "Blow Your Whistle" on their song "Who Stole the Soul?" on their album Fear of a Black Planet in 1990.
- 2Pac sampled "We Share" on his song "Old School" on his album Me Against the World in 1995.
- Eve sampled "Blow Your Whistle" on her song "Tambourine" featuring Swizz Beatz in 2007.
- Lloyd featuring Lil Wayne sampled "Ashley's Roachclip" on his song "Girls Around the World" on his album Lessons in Love in 2008.
