= Go Go Swing Live =

Live album by Chuck Brown & the Soul Searchers
- Released: 1986
- Recorded: 1986
- Venue: The Crystal Skate; Temple Hills, Maryland
- Genre: Go-go; swing; jazz-funk
- Length: 61:09
- Label: Future Sound Records
- Producer: Reo Edwards

Chuck Brown & the Soul Searchers chronology
Funk Express (1980)	Go Go Swing Live (1986)	Any Other Way to Go? (1987)

Professional ratings
Review scores
Source	Rating
AllMusic	4/5 stars
Artistdirect	4/5 stars
musicHound R&B	(4/5)

Go Go Swing Live is a live album recorded and released in 1986 by the Washington, D.C.–based go-go band Chuck Brown & the Soul Searchers. The album was recorded at the Crystal Skate (in Temple Hills, Maryland) and at the RSVP (a defunct nightclub in Washington, D.C.)

The album consists of go-go renditions of classic jazz and swing songs performed with a go-go beat. The album is especially known for remakes of the calypso song "Run Joe", and the swing songs "Stormy Monday" and "It Don't Mean a Thing". The album was ranked No. 1 as the "Best Album Recorded in D.C." by DCist.

== Track listing ==
No.	Title	Writer(s)	Length
1.	"It Don't Mean a Thing (If It Don't Have the Go Go Swing)"	Duke Ellington; Irving Mills	3:15
2.	"Midnight Sun"	Sonny Burke; Lionel Hampton; Johnny Mercer	3:23
3.	"Moody's Mood"	Dorothy Fields; Jimmy McHugh; James Moody	5:07
4.	"Woody Woodpecker"	Louis Jordan; Joe Willoughby	2:23
5.	"Harlem Nocturne"	Earle H. Hagen	5:49
6.	"Run Joe"	Louis Jordan; Joe Willoughby	8:54
7.	"Stormy Monday"	T-Bone Walker	5:46
8.	"Boogie on Go-Go Woman"	Stevie Wonder	7:02
9.	"Family Affair"	Sylvester "Sly Stone" Stewart	6:12
10.	"Take the Go-Go Train"	Billy Strayhorn	4:51
11.	"Day-O"	Irving Burgie	8:31
Total length:			61:09

== Personnel ==
- Chuck Brown – lead vocals, electric guitar
- Ricardo D. Wellman – drums
- Rowland Smith – congas, backing vocals
- Glenn Ellis – bass guitar, percussion
- Curtis Johnson – keyboards
- John M. Buchannan – keyboards, trombone
- Leroy Fleming – tenor saxophone, backing vocals
- Donald Tillery – trumpet, tambourine, backing vocals
