= It Don't Mean a Thing (If It Ain't Got That Swing) =

1932 composition by Duke Ellington

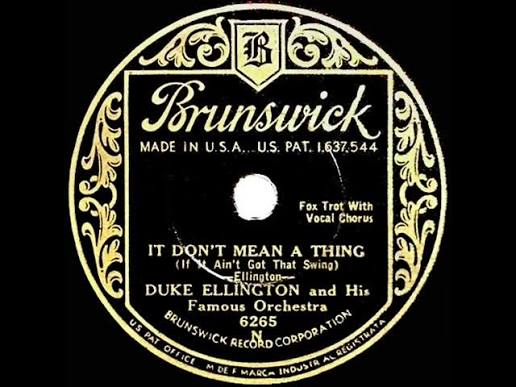
- 1932 Label Cover

Song by Duke Ellington
- Published: 1932 by Mills Music
- Released: 1932
- Recorded: February 2, 1932
- Genre: Jazz
- Length: 3:09
- Label: Brunswick
- Composer: Duke Ellington
- Lyricist: Irving Mills

"It Don't Mean a Thing (If It Ain't Got That Swing)" is a 1931 composition by Duke Ellington with lyrics by Bubber Miley, first published by Irving Mills. It is accepted as a jazz standard, and jazz historian Gunther Schuller characterized it as "now legendary" and "a prophetic piece and a prophetic title". In 2008, Ellington's 1932 recording of the song was inducted into the Grammy Hall of Fame.

== Background ==
The music was composed and arranged by Ellington in August 1931 during intermissions at the Lincoln Tavern in Chicago; the lyrics were contributed by Irving Mills. According to Ellington, the song's title was the credo of trumpeter Bubber Miley, who was dying of tuberculosis at the time; Miley died the year the song was released.

The song was first recorded by Ellington and his orchestra for Brunswick Records on February 2, 1932. Ivie Anderson sang the vocal and trombonist Joe Nanton and alto saxophonist Johnny Hodges played the solos. In later performances, trumpeter Ray Nance often sang the vocal.

The song became famous, Ellington wrote, "as the expression of a sentiment which prevailed among jazz musicians at the time". It contains one of the earliest uses in popular music of the term "swing".

== Other versions ==
External videos
- Ella Fitzgerald and Duke Ellington perform "It Don't Mean a Thing" on The Ed Sullivan Show, March 7, 1965
- Tony Bennett and Lady Gaga record "It Don't Mean a Thing," 2014

"It Don't Mean a Thing" (1932) excerpt
Sample of "It Don't Mean a Thing (If It Ain't Got That Swing)" with scat singing by The Boswell Sisters.

- The Mills Brothers (1932)
- The Boswell Sisters (1932)
- Roger Wolfe Kahn (1932)
- Stephane Grappelli with Django Reinhardt (1935)
- Mel Tormé (in Musical Sounds Are The Best Songs, 1954)
- Dizzy Gillespie and Stan Getz (in Diz and Getz, 1955)
- Thelonious Monk – Thelonious Monk Plays the Music of Duke Ellington (Riverside, 1955), familiar to listeners of American Public Media's Marketplace radio program, which plays Monk's version as background accompaniment whenever the Dow Jones Industrial Average results are mixed
- Sidney Bechet and Martial Solal – Sidney Bechet-Martial Solal Quartet Featuring Kenny Clarke (1957)
- Buddy Rich (in Buddy Rich Just Sings, 1957)
- Louis Armstrong and Duke Ellington – The Great Reunion (1961)
- Buddy Rich and Gene Krupa (in Burnin' Beat, 1962)
- Chet Atkins in My Favorite Guitars, (1964)
- Ella Fitzgerald and Duke Ellington – Ella and Duke at the Cote D'Azur (Verve, 1967)
- Teresa Brewer and Duke Ellington (1974)
- Chuck Brown – Go Go Swing Live (1987)
- Diane Schuur with Stan Getz – Schuur Thing (1985)
- Dr. John – Duke Elegant (2000)
- Tony Bennett and Lady Gaga – Cheek To Cheek (2014)
