= We the People (The Soul Searchers album) =

Studio album by The Soul Searchers
- Released: 1972
- Recorded: 1972
- Studios: American Star Studio, Falls Church, Virginia
- Genres: Soul; jazz-funk; go-go
- Length: 39:29
- Label: Sussex
- Producers: Carroll Hynson; Joe Tate

The Soul Searchers chronology
We the People (1972)	Salt of the Earth (1974)

We the People is the debut album by the Washington, D.C.-based group the Soul Searchers.

Professional ratings
Review scores
Source	Rating
AllMusic	3/5 stars
ARTISTdirect	3/5 stars

== Track listing ==
Side A

1. "We the People" (Chuck Brown, John Buchanan) – 5:28
2. "Your Love Is So Doggone Good" (Dee Ervin, Rudy Love) – 8:36
3. "It's All in Your Mind" (Chuck Brown, John Buchanan) – 3:06
4. "Soul to the People" (The Soul Searchers - Chuck Brown, Donald Tillery, Hilton Felton, Horace Brock, John Buchanan, John Euwell, Kenneth Scoggins, Lino Druitt, Lloyd Pinchback) – 2:58

Side B

1. "Think" (James Brown) – 4:47
2. "1993" (John Buchanan) – 4:54
3. "When Will My Eyes See" (Donald Tillery) – 3:30
4. "Blowout" (John Buchanan) – 6:06

== Personnel ==
The Soul Searchers

- Chuck Brown – electric guitar, lead vocals
- John "J.B." Buchanan – trombone, piano
- Donald Tillery – trumpet, percussion, vocals
- John Euwell – bass guitar, vocals
- Kenneth Scoggins – drums
- Lino Druitt – congas, percussion
- Lloyd Pinchback – flute, tenor saxophone, soprano saxophone, vocals
- Hilton Felton - organ

with:

- Horace Brock – organ on "We the People"
- Glen Christensen - art direction
- Joel Brodsky - photography
