= We Need Some Money =

Single by Chuck Brown & the Soul Searchers
- Released: 1984
- Recorded: 1984
- Genre: R&B
- Length: 8:24 (extended version); 4:28 (single version)
- Label: T.T.E.D.
- Songwriter(s): Chuck Brown; Curtis Johnson
- Producer(s): Maxx Kidd, Reo Edwards

"We Need Some Money" is a single by the Washington, D.C.–based go-go band Chuck Brown & the Soul Searchers, which was released as a single in 1984. The song has been sampled by many hip-hop artists, including songs by Kid 'n Play and Wreckx-n-Effect, and is currently used in many promotional advertisements for the D.C. Lottery. Maryland rock band Clutch has long used a bootleg version of the song as their live-show introduction, and released a cover version on the deluxe version of their 2015 album Psychic Warfare.

== Track listing ==
Side 1

1. "We Need Some Money" (radio version 1) – 4:28
2. "We Need Some Money" (radio version 2) – 4:53

Side 2

1. "We Need Some Money" (extended version) – 8:24
