= Midnight Sun (Lionel Hampton and Sonny Burke song) =

Jazz standard

Song by Lionel Hampton
- Published: 1947
- Genre: Jazz standard
- Composers: Lionel Hampton and Sonny Burke
- Lyricist: Johnny Mercer

"Midnight Sun" was originally an instrumental composed by Lionel Hampton and Sonny Burke in 1947 and is now considered a jazz standard. Subsequently, Johnny Mercer wrote the words to the song.

== First recording ==
"Midnight Sun" was first recorded by Lionel Hampton himself and his orchestra in a Los Angeles studio on November 10, 1947, with solos by Hampton and trumpeter Wendell Culley (Decca Matrix L 4546). First releases on the Decca label were on the B-side of 10-inch shellack singles, where the song was coupled with either "Blow-Top Blues", composed by Leonard Feather and played by the Hampton Sextet with "lovely" vocals by Sarah Vaughan (Decca 28059), or "Three Minutes on 52nd Street", another Hampton original recorded with the orchestra (Decca 28059 and Brunswick 03780 in the UK).

== The lyrics ==
According to Philip Furia, Johnny Mercer was driving along the freeway from Palm Springs to Hollywood, California, when he heard the instrumental on his car radio and started to set words to the song as he drove. The lyrics were first recorded by June Christy for her 1954 album Something Cool. One famous recording of the song with the Mercer lyrics is by Ella Fitzgerald on her album Like Someone in Love from 1957. Fitzgerald recorded the song again in 1964 for her album Ella Fitzgerald Sings the Johnny Mercer Songbook and once more in 1978. "Midnight Sun" also became part of the repertoire of Carmen McRae after she recorded it first in 1955. Tribute albums to both singers by following jazz vocalists such as Dee Dee Bridgewater or Vanessa Rubin included the song associated with them, and Natalie Cole also sang the song in a tribute show called "We Love Ella" at the University of Southern California's Galen Center in 2007.

== Recordings ==
"V" indicates vocal recordings with the lyrics by Johnny Mercer. Other entries are instrumental interpretations of the composition.

Date	Artist	Album	V	Notes
1947	Lionel Hampton Orchestra	single (Decca L 4546)		first recording of the song; reissued in 1948 on New Movements in Be-Bop
1952	Coleman Hawkins	single (various 7-inch and 10-inch)		with Orchestra arranged and conducted by Danny Mendelsohn; album release 1958 on The Hawk Talks
1953	Les Brown and His Band of Renown	single		arranged by Frank Comstock
1953	Les Brown and His Band of Renown	Concert at the Palladium (Vol. 2)		live recording of the Comstock arrangement, released as 7-inch EP and various LP editions
1953	Page Cavanaugh Trio	single		
1954	June Christy	Something Cool	v	first vocal recording of the song, with orchestra led by Pete Rugolo. The initial mono 10-inch was entirely re-recorded in stereo in 1960.
1954	Harry James	Dancing in Person with Harry James at the Hollywood Palladium		arrangement by Neal Hefti
1955	Lionel Hampton and His Orchestra	Apollo Hall Concert 1954		
1955	Lionel Hampton	single		featuring Buddy Rich on drums, released on Clef, 1963 album release Here's Gates
1957	Ella Fitzgerald	Like Someone in Love	v	
1957	Art Pepper, Bob Cooper et al.	Showcase for Modern Jazz		originally credited to guitarist Howard Lucraft who directed the session
1958	Duke Ellington's Spacemen	The Cosmic Scene		The melody is played by the horn section with soloing by Clark Terry and Jimmy Hamilton
1958	Teddy Charles and His Sextet	Salute to Hamp (Flyin' Home)		with Bob Brookmeyer, Zoot Sims and Art Farmer.
1958	Julie London	Julie	v	with Jimmy Rowles and His Orchestra
1959	Maxwell Davis with Members of the Lionel Hampton Orchestra	Compositions of Lionel Hampton and Others...		also released as The Stereophonic Sound of Lionel Hampton by the Members of the Lionel Hampton Orchestra
1959	Larry Elgart	Larry Elgart and His Orchestra		
1960	June Christy	Road Show	v	
1960	Lou Donaldson	Midnight Sun		first released 1980
1960	Stan Kenton and His Orchestra	Road Show		
1960	Jo Stafford	Jo + Jazz		
1962	Tito Puente	The Exciting Tito Puente Band in Hollywood		Latin version with Puente playing vibraphone
1963	Brother Jack McDuff	The Midnight Sun		first released in 1968
1963	Sarah Vaughan	Sarah Sings Soulfully	v	with a quartet arranged by Gerald Wilson
1964	The Four Freshmen	More 4 Freshmen and 5 Trombones		
1965	Arthur Lyman	Call of the Midnight Sun		
1966	Lou Donaldson	Musty Rusty		
1966	Lionel Hampton	Hamp in Japan / Live		with his orchestra
1967	Nancy Wilson	Lush Life	v	
1968	Carmen McRae	"Live" & Wailing	v	
1969	Willie Mitchell	The Many Moods of Willie Mitchell		
1972	Tony Bennett	The Good Things in Life	v	
1975	Ella Fitzgerald & Oscar Peterson	Ella and Oscar	v	
1978	Sarah Vaughan	How Long Has This Been Going On?	v	
1986	June Christy	A Lovely Way to Spend an Evening	v	
1987	Kate Ceberano	Kate Ceberano and her Septet	v	
1987	Mel Tormé and George Shearing	A Vintage Year	v	
1988	Flora Purim	Midnight Sun	v	
1994	Vanessa Rubin	I'm Glad There Is You - A Tribute to Carmen McRae	v	
1997	Dee Dee Bridgewater	Dear Ella	v	
1997	Diana Krall	Midnight In The Garden of Good and Evil (Soundtrack)	v	
1998	Dee Dee Bridgewater	Live at Yoshi's	v	
1998	Abbey Lincoln	Wholly Earth	v	
2001	Rebecca Martin	Middlehope	v	
2001	Diane Schuur and Maynard Ferguson	Swingin' for Schuur	v	
2003	Holly Cole	Shade	v	
2004	Al Jarreau	Accentuate the Positive	v	arranged by Larry Williams featuring Tollak Ollestad on harmonica
2005	Renée Fleming	Haunted Heart	v	
2005	Hugh Masekela	Almost Like Being in Jazz		
2007	Elizabeth Shepherd	Besides	v	
2007	Natalie Cole	We Love Ella! A Tribute to the First Lady of Song	v	tribute show with an orchestra directed by co-host Quincy Jones, released on DVD
2008	Paul Motian Trio 2000 + Two	On Broadway Volume 5		
2008	Dianne Reeves	When You Know	v	
2009	Quincy Jones featuring Al Jarreau	The 75th Birthday Celebration	v	
2010	Esperanza Spalding	Chamber Music Society	v	a solo interpretation, only as a bonus track on the Japanese release. She had already played the song at the Newport Jazz Festival in 2008.
2019	Krystyna Stańko	Aquarius - The Orchestral Session	v	orchestrated and directed by Krzysztof Herdzin, featuring violinist Mateusz Smoczyński
2021	Julius Rodriguez	Midnight Sun - EP		

== See also ==
- Lionel Hampton
