= The Beat: Go-Go's Fusion of Funk and Hip-Hop =

2001 non-fiction book by Kip Lornell and Charles C. Stephenson, Jr.

- front cover: Chuck Brown at the Festival of American Folklife, July 2000.
- Author: Kip Lornell; Charles C. Stephenson, Jr.
- Cover artist: Michael Gengaro
- Language: English
- Subject: Go-go
- Genre: Non-fiction; Music Reference
- Publisher: Billboard Books; University Press of Mississippi
- Publication date: 2001 (first edition)
- Publication place: United States
- Media type: Print (paperback)
- Pages: 256
- ISBN: 0-8230-7727-6
- OCLC: 47648299
- Dewey Decimal: 781.64
- LC Class: ML3527.84

The Beat: Go-Go's Fusion of Funk and Hip-Hop is a 2001 book written by Kip Lornell and Charles C. Stephenson, Jr. In 2009, an updated second edition of the book was published and retitled The Beat! Go-Go Music from Washington, D.C.

== Synopsis ==
The Beat explores the musical, social, and cultural phenomenon of go-go music (a music genre is rooted in funk, soul and old-school hip hop) the only musical from indigenous to Washington, D.C., which features highly syncopated, nonstop beats.

Charles Stephenson (a political and cultural activist, and former manager of Experience Unlimited) and Kip Lornell (professor of Africana Studies at The George Washington University) provide a chronology of go-go music, from the influences of funk music, Pentecostal churches, and West African rhythms that influenced the genre, to the emerging popularity of the genre. The authors focused on prominent figures and institutions important to the shaping of go-go music, including accomplished go-go musicians Chuck Brown (the "Godfather of Go-Go"), Experience Unlimited, Rare Essence, and Trouble Funk.

Many other Washington, D.C.–based DJ's, band managers, concert promoters and film-makers who've provided significant influences to the genre, also provided their perspective of the genre.

== Compilation album ==
The Beat: Go-Go's Fusion of Funk and Hip-Hop

Compilation album by Various Artists
- Released: September 4, 2001
- Genres: Go-go; old-school hip hop
- Length: 1:54:07
- Label: Liaison Records
- Producers: Becky Marcus; Tom Goldfogle

Professional ratings
Review scores
Source	Rating
AllMusic	4/5 stars
Robert Christgau	A−
Spin	8/10
The Village Voice	A−

The Beat: Go-Go's Fusion of Funk and Hip-Hop is a double-compilation album released on September 4, 2001, in conjunction with the release of book. The album features a compilation of songs by prominent go-go bands and old-school hip hop artist who contributed to the popularity of the genre between the early-80s to the late-1990s.

== Track listing ==
Disc 01
No.	Title	Contributing artist	Length
1.	"Bustin' Loose (song)" (Chuck Brown)	Chuck Brown & the Soul Searchers	7:40
2.	"Pump Me Up" (Tony Fisher/Robert Reed)	Trouble Funk	6:34
3.	"Party Time" (Kurtis Blow/Jimmy Bralower/J.B. Moore)	Kurtis Blow	6:45
4.	"Cat In the Hat" (Anthony Harley)	Little Benny & the Masters	7:01
5.	"Da Butt" (Marcus Miller/Edward Stevens)	E.U.	6:21
6.	"The Music Ain't Loud Enuff" (DJ Kool/Funky Ned)	DJ Kool	5:32
7.	"You Can Dance"	Go-Go Lorenzo	7:10
8.	"Jingling Baby!" (Harold Hall)	Pleasure Band	4:21
9.	"Lock It" (Michael Neal/J. Karen Thomas)	Rare Essence	5:49

Disc 02
No.	Title	Contributing artist	Length
1.	"Booty Call"	Northeast Groovers	7:15
2.	"Ruff It Off" (D.K. Baker/W.Wright)	The Junkyard Band	4:27
3.	"The Bud"	Huck-A-Bucks	7:38
4.	"Um Bop Bop"	Sugar Bear & Ju-Ju	3:46
5.	"Diamond in the Back"	Suttle Thoughts	5:38
6.	"The Hop" (Kent Wood)	Rare Essence	4:31
7.	"People Make the World Go Round" (Thom Bell/Linda Creed)	Chuck Brown	4:40
8.	"2001"	The Backyard Band	5:25
9.	"Hey Buddy Buddy" (Michael Neal/J. Karen Thomas)	Rare Essence	7:43
10.	"Brown and White"	911 Entertainment	5:51
Total length:			1:54:07
