= The Legend of Cool "Disco" Dan =

- Directed by: Joseph Pattisall
- Written by: Joseph Pattisall
- Starring: Henry Rollins (narrator); Cool "Disco" Dan
- Edited by: Joseph Pattisall
- Music by: Iley Brown
- Production company: MVD Entertainment Group
- Distributed by: R. Rock Enterprises; Wraith Films
- Release date: April 15, 2013
- Running time: 96 minutes
- Country: United States
- Language: English

The Legend of Cool "Disco" Dan is a 2013 American documentary film written and directed by Joseph Pattisall. The film was released on April 15, 2013 in conjunction with the release of the book Pump Me Up: DC Subculture in the 1980s. The documentary was narrated by Washington, D.C.-native Henry Rollins. The Legend of Cool "Disco" Dan provides a documentation of Washington, D.C. during the 1970s and 1980s from the perspective of Cool "Disco" Dan, and blends commentary by local Washingtonians combined with archival footage, forming a comprehensive portrait of this time period.

== Synopsis ==
The Legend of Cool "Disco" Dan examines the life of mythical graffiti artist Cool "Disco" Dan, while juxtaposing his life against many of the historical events from the 1970s and 1980s that shaped the culture of Washington, D.C. Cool "Disco" Dan (real name Danny Hogg) was born on December 31, 1969, on the very last day of the 1960s. It was a revolutionary decade that saw the rise of Civil Rights Movement, the assassination of prominent political figures, and the Vietnam War. During this period, D.C. was experiencing race riots in the aftermath of Martin Luther King Jr.'s assassination, heightened racial tensions and white flight, and blacks from southern and northern states relocating to D.C. in search of better economic opportunities during the Great Migration. This eventually transformed the city's demographics into a largely majority black city and introduced the label "Chocolate City". Additionally, it marked the beginning shift in local politics, and the beginning of home-grown music and musical acts (particularly go-go music and culture) all of which influenced Cool "Disco" Dan's graffiti.

Beginning in the 1970s, Hogg adapted the nickname "Disco Dan" after being inspired by an episode of What's Happening!! He was also fascinated with the murals in the opening credits of Good Times, along with the cover art of many funk albums. He taught himself to draw and eventually was able to completely duplicate the vibrant artwork of those albums. Also around this time, Marion Barry's political career was on the rise, as he was elected mayor with a platform based on helping the poor, implementing a 'summer jobs programs' for the youth, and helping senior citizens and the cities most vulnerable. The development of go-go and harDCore music was also in its early stages.

By the 1980s, Disco Dan had perfected his graffiti art skills just as the popularity of go-go music and harDCore was heightening throughout the city. Inspired by "roll-calls" and call and responses during go-go concerts (where patrons got their names and neighborhoods immortalized on P.A. tapes and live album recordings), Disco Dan began immortalizing himself by tagging his nickname on Metro buses and rails, vacant building, and throughout the Washington metropolitan area. At the height of his fame, go-go was also reaching the height of its fame, and the energy levels around the city had reached a fevering peak with the rise of local sports teams—the Washington Bullets, the Big East Conference and the Georgetown Hoyas (John Thompson, Patrick Ewing, Alonzo Mourning), Maryland Terrapins (Lefty Driesell and Len Bias), Sugar Ray Leonard, and the Washington Redskins (Doug Williams)—and the peak of the local politicians Marion Barry and Sharon Pratt Kelly, along with the crack epidemic and illegal drug trade, AIDS epidemic, materialism, hip-hop music, elevated murder rates, Reaganomics, homelessness, George H. W. Bush's war on drugs, and the ubiquity of Cool "Disco Dan" graffiti all peaked simultaneously during this time period.

== Contributors ==
- Paul Hendrickson (The Washington Post journalist)
- Cynthia Connolly (photographer & curator)
- Alona Wartofsky (journalist)
- Iley Brown (music historian)
- Jonathan Binstock (Corcoran Gallery of Art)
- Paul Berry (Channel 7 Newscaster)
- Chuck Brown (the Godfather of Go-Go)
- Gregory "Sugar Bear" Elliott (Experience Unlimited)
- D.C. Scorpio (hip-hop artist)
- Stinky Dink (hip-hop artist)
- Tony "Big Tony" Fisher (Trouble Funk)
- Andre "Whiteboy" Johnson (Rare Essence)
- Big Brother CJ (Go-Go musician)
- Darrell West (Mass Extinction)
- Vincent Shacks (Go-Go musician)
- Grevlin Trombone Hunter (Go-Go musician)
- Tidy (Go-Go musician)
- Big Butch (Go-Go promoter)
- Hollywood Breeze (Go-Go club owner)
- Scooter Magruder (The Blues Computer radio personality)
- Frank Ski (radio DJ)
- Marion Barry (former mayor)
- Walter E. Fauntroy (civil rights activist)
- Lisa of the World (Lady Chronicles)
- Tonya F (Lady Chronicles)
- Nizam Ali (Ben's Chili Bowl)
- Dick Dyszel (Count Gore de Vol)
- Asas "ULTRA" Walker (graffiti artist)
- Cycle (graffiti artist)
- Caleb Neelon (graffiti historian)
- Ken Olden (harDCore guitarist)
- Rob Myers (graphic artist/musician)
- Ian MacKaye (Dischord Records/musician)
- Seth Hurwitz (9:30 Club)

== Release ==
The documentary was part of the Corcoran Gallery of Art's exhibit for Pump Me Up: DC Subculture in the 1980s. The documentary also screened at the AFI Silver Theatre and Cultural Center in Silver Spring, Maryland from February 23, 2013 to March 1, 2013, and screen nationwide at select theatres. The DVD was released on March 11, 2014.

== See also ==
- Street art
- Go-go (a funk subgenre of Washington, D.C.)
- harDCore (a hardcore punk subgenre of Washington, D.C.)
- Culture of Washington, D.C.
- Music of Washington, D.C.
- Straight Up Go-Go, 1992 documentary
- Heavy Metal Parking Lot, 1986 documentary
