= Stone Cold Hustler =

- album cover

Single by D.C. Scorpio
- Released: 1987
- Genre: hip-hop; go-go
- Length: 3:48 (radio version); 8:39 (long version)
- Label: Kolossal Records
- Songwriters: D.C. Scorpio; Michael Neal
- Producer: Michael Neal

D.C. Scorpio singles chronology
| "Stone Cold Hustler" (1987) | "Beam Me Up, Scotty" (1988) |

Music video
- Stone Cold Hustler on YouTube

"Stone Cold Hustler" is the debut single released in 1987 by the Washington, D.C.–based hip-hop artist D.C. Scorpio. The song was performed live at Go Go Live at the Capital Centre in 1987, and the single was released thereafter. The song also appears on the 1988 compilation album The Go Go Posse.

== Background ==
On April 15, 1987, D.C. Scorpio was part of a rap contest held at the Chapter III go-go club in Washington, D.C. The winner of the contest would win an opportunity to perform live at the annual go-go concert held at the Capital Centre (the defunct arena formerly located in Landover, Maryland). Doug E. Fresh was one of the honorable judges along with several prominent go-go musicians. D.C. Scorpio won the contest by rapping poignantly about the drug dealing and violence associated with the crack epidemic of the D.C. region in the late-1980s. The song was titled "Stone Cold Hustler" and D.C. Scorpio performed the song live at Go Go Live at the Capital Centre with Chuck Brown & the Soul Searchers.

After the single was released, it quickly became a popular hit and D.C. Scorpio quickly became known as the region's pioneer rapper. Before this point, hip-hop was not popular in the D.C.-region, while go-go music was at its zenith in popularity in D.C. Most hip-hop artists were unable to sellout concerts in D.C. unless a go-go band was on the ticket. However, after the release of "Stone Cold Hustler" the D.C.-region became more receptive of the hip-hop genre.

== Track listing ==
Side A (33-1/3 RPM)

1. "Stone Cold Hustler" (long version) – 8:39

Side B (33-1/3 RPM)

1. "Stone Cold Hustler" (instrumental) – 8:39
2. "Stone Cold Hustler" (radio version) – 3:48

== See also ==
- Hip hop in Washington, D.C.
- Go Go Live at the Capital Centre
