= Go Go Live at the Capital Centre =

Live album by Various Artists
- Released: December 18, 1987
- Venue: Capital Centre; Landover, Maryland
- Genre: Go-go; old-school hip hop
- Length: 100:00
- Label: I Hear Ya Records
- Producer: Darryll Brooks

Professional ratings
Review scores
Source	Rating
ARTISTdirect	3/5 stars
Los Angeles Times	3.5/4 stars
Robert Christgau	B+

Go Go Live at the Capital Centre was a concert performance by various prominent go-go bands and hip-hop artists based in the Washington metropolitan area. It was recorded live in October 1987 at the Capital Centre (a defunct indoor arena in Landover, Maryland). The double–cassette was released by "I Hear Ya Records" on December 18, 1987, and the video recording was released on VHS-tape by "G Street Express" on the same day.

The concert was a sold-out event with over 24,000 concert-goers in attendance. This concert also marked the first time an all go-go lineup exclusively headlined an event at the Capital Center.

== Track listing ==
No.	Title	Performer(s)	Length
1.	"Stone Cold Hustler"	D.C. Scorpio	6:56
2.	"Cabbage Patch"	Experience Unlimited	5:20
3.	"Shake it Like a White Girl"	Experience Unlimited	5:43
4.	"Go Ju Ju Go"	Experience Unlimited	5:51
5.	"Cat in the Hat"	Little Benny & the Masters	3:45
6.	"R.E. Herman 2x"	Rare Essence	15:17
7.	"Still Gettin' Buzy"	Rare Essence	10:57
8.	"Whip It"	Rare Essence	6:19
9.	"Hey Buddy Buddy"	Rare Essence	1:35
10.	"Do You Know What Time It Is?"	Rare Essence	3:28
11.	"Run Joe"	Chuck Brown & the Soul Searchers	7:29
12.	"You Know What Time It Is?"	Chuck Brown & the Soul Searchers	3:51
13.	"I'm Bad"	Chuck Brown & the Soul Searchers	6:01
14.	"Day-O"	Chuck Brown & the Soul Searchers	8:21
15.	"Wiggle Your Body"	Hot, Cold Sweat	1:51
16.	"You Can Dance If You Want To"	Go-Go Lorenzo	0:48
17.	"Junkyard Jam"	Junkyard Band	3:40
Total length:			100:00
