= The Go Go Posse =

Compilation album by Various Artists
- Released: 1988
- Genre: Go-go; old-school hip hop
- Length: 40:25
- Label: I Hear Ya! Records

Singles from The Go Go Posse
- 1. "D.C. Don't Stand for Dodge City" Released: November 8, 1988

Professional ratings
Review scores
Source	Rating
AllMusic	4.5/5 stars
ARTISTdirect	4.5/5 stars
Robert Christgau	B+

The Go Go Posse is a compilation album released in 1988. The album consists of nine original songs recorded by prominent Washington, D.C.–based go-go bands and hip hop artists, and includes the anti-violence song "D.C. Don't Stand for Dodge City".

== Track listing ==
No.	Title	Producer(s)	Length
1.	"Do It" (performed by Rare Essence)	Donnell Floyd; Mike Neal	4:50
2.	"That'll Work" (performed by Chuck Brown & the Soul Searchers)	Chuck Brown; Square One	3:58
3.	"Beam Me Up, Scotty" (performed by D.C. Scorpio)	Donnell Floyd; Mike Neal	3:38
4.	"Who's Kickin' It" (performed by Little Benny & the Masters)	Anthony Harley; Bill Mueller; Mark Lawson; Square One	3:38
5.	"D.C. Don't Stand for Dodge City" (performed by "The Go Go Posse")	Bill Mueller; Square One	4:24
6.	"Romance the Stone" (performed by D.C. Scorpio)	Donnell Floyd; Mike Neal	4:24
7.	"The King" (performed by Little Benny & the Masters)	Anthony Harley; Bill Mueller; Mark Lawson; Square One	3:37
8.	"Go Ju Ju Go" (performed by E.U.)	Square One	5:23
9.	"Hey Now" (performed Rare Essence)	Chuck Brown; Rare Essence	6:33
Total length:			40:25

== Background ==
The "Go Go Posse" was a supergroup consisting of D.C. Scorpio, Chuck Brown & the Soul Searchers, Rare Essence, Little Benny & the Masters, and E.U. The song "D.C. Don't Stand for Dodge City" was an anti-violence song recorded and released as a single in 1988. The song was released in response to the dramatic increase in violent and drug-related murders in D.C. during the crack epidemic in the late-1980s. During this time period, D.C. was labeled the "Murder Capital of the United States" and go-go and hip hop culture received much of the blame for the increasing crime rates. The "Go Go Posse" united to release this song as a response to the growing criticism of go-go music, and to encourage its patrons to stop the violence. The album was Produced, Written and Arranged by Jonathan Ranard Smith, Jon Mitchell Bebbs and Darrell Johnson also identified in the album's credits as Square One Productions as well as J. J. & J.

== See also ==
- Stop the Violence Movement
- Crime in Washington, D.C.
