= Y'all Don't Understand =

Live album by Junk Yard Band
- Released: October 17, 2000
- Genre: Go-go
- Length: 65:19
- Label: Future; Liaison
- Producer: Reo Edwards; Moe Shorter

Junk Yard Band chronology
The Beginning/The End (1999)	Y'all Don't Understand (2000)

Y'all Don't Understand is a live album released on October 17, 2000, by the Washington, D.C.–based go-go band Junk Yard Band.

== Track listing ==
1. "Where My Homies" – 4:46
2. "1-On-1" – 4:17
3. "Y'all Don't" – 0:50
4. "Thug Song" – 5:18
5. "Hee Haw" – 5:23
6. "Wink and Dogs" – 5:32
7. "Peach Fuzz" – 2:27
8. "Go-Hard" – 7:58
9. "Congo Break" – 8:20
10. "Ruff it Off" – 9:29
11. "Tiddy Ball" – 6:19
12. "You Can Hate Me" – 4:23
