= Beam me up =

Beam me up or Beam me up, Scotty may refer to:

- Beam me up, Scotty, a catch-phrase originating from Star Trek
  - Using the Transporter
- "Beam Me Up, Scotty" (D.C. Scorpio song), a 1988 song by D.C. Scorpio
- Beam Me Up!, a record label run by Speedy J between 1993 and 1996.
  - "Beam Me Up!", a song from Speedy J's first album, Ginger.
- "Beam Me Up", a 2008 song by Tay Dizm
- Beam Me Up Scotty (mixtape), a 2009 mixtape by Nicki Minaj
- Beam Me Up!, a 2010 album by Daniel Johnston
- "Beam Me Up", a 2012 song by Pink from her album The Truth About Love
- "Beam Me Up", also known as "Beam Me Up (Kill Mode)", a 2012 song by Cazzette
- "Beam Me Up Scotty" (2point4 children), an episode of British TV show 2point4 children
