= Straight Up Go-Go =

- Written by: Shuaib Muhammed Kedar; Shuaib Mitchell
- Directed by: Shuaib Muhammed Kedar; Shuaib Mitchell
- Starring: The Junkyard Band; Rare Essence; Nelson George; Experience Unlimited; Cathy Hughes
- Country of origin: United States
- Original language: English

Production
- Producers: Fred Brown Jr.; Shuaib Muhammed Kedar; Shuaib Mitchell; Sowande Tichawonna
- Running time: 59 minutes
- Budget: $25,000 (estimate)

Original release
- Network: WHUT-TV
- Release: March 11, 1992

Straight Up Go-Go is a 1992 documentary film directed by Shuaib Muhammed Kedar and Shuaib Mitchell. The documentary was first broadcast on March 11, 1992, on WHUT-TV (a PBS member public television, owned and operated by Howard University).

== Synopsis ==
The directors analyze and theorize about the roots and historical impacts that influenced the development of go-go music. The documentary captures footage of go-go bands performing at various musical festival throughout the Washington metropolitan area (such as the "Georgia Avenue Festival", "F Street Festival", and music festivals at Anacostia Park and Wilmer's Park) and compares the rhythmic similarities to those found in West African music. It also traces many of the musical influences of Cab Calloway, James Brown, and Fela Kuti have added to the development of go-go culture. Many of the prominent go-go bands and musical artist of the time period also provided their personal analysis and insight to the influences of go-go music and its culture.

=== Contributors ===
- Pleasure Band
- The Junkyard Band
- The Uptown Crew
- Rare Essence
- Leroy Fleming
- Nelson George
- Richard Harrington
- Cathy Hughes
- Maxx Kidd
- Jill Nelson
- Mamadi Nyasuma
- Salt-N-Pepa
- Charles Stephenson
- Experience Unlimited

== See also ==
- Music of Washington, D.C.
- Go Go Live at the Capital Centre — 1987 go-go concert
- Good to Go — 1986 film
