= Go-Go Museum =

Coordinates: 38°52′01″N 76°59′19″W

The Go-Go Museum is a museum located in Washington, D.C., dedicated to go-go music, a variety of funk music developed in the city. The museum, located in the Anacostia neighborhood of Southeast Washington, has been offering virtual programming since 2020, and opened officially on February 19, 2025.

== History ==
Go-go music originated in Washington, D.C., in the mid-1960s to late-1970s and is recognizable by its syncopated rhythms and call-and-response vocals. Notable go-go musicians include Chuck Brown, Rare Essence and Experience Unlimited.

The museum's conception dates back to a 2019 neighborhood dispute. In April 2019, a resident in the Shaw neighborhood of Washington threatened a lawsuit against a MetroPCS retailer who had been playing go-go music from a speaker outside that location since 1995. This dispute was compounded by the fact that the shop's location is on Chuck Brown Way, a street corner named to honor the go-go musician.

This dispute caused an uproar among local citizens who felt that the situation was emblematic of the rapid gentrification of the neighborhood and an erosion of local culture in the District. Over 80,000 people signed a petition demanding that the owner be allowed to continue playing go-go music from outside his store. The movement that formed around this incident was named Don't Mute DC, named after a tweet by Howard University senior Julian Broomfield.

Two leaders within the Don't Mute DC movement, community activist Ronald Moten and Howard professor Dr. Natalie Hopkinson, were the organizers behind the museum project. Moten came up with the idea for a museum for go-go in 2009, while Hopkinson wrote her thesis on go-go music.

The city government worked to address the situation and the movement. Mayor Muriel Bowser provided a plan to the Council of the District of Columbia to support go-go music entitled "The Go-Go People's Plan". That plan included recognizing go-go music as the official music of the District and selecting the Go-Go Museum site as a key implementing partner of her plan.

About $2.5 million was raised to fund the creation of the museum.

The museum began its programming in 2020, with a virtual discussion between Hopkinson and Ta-Nehisi Coates and a performance by the go-go band The First Ladies of Go-Go.

Beginning in 2023, the museum created a "Mobile Go-Go Museum topped with a live stage and interactive exhibits" while the museum site was being developed.

The museum launched a soft opening on November 18, 2024, with a grand opening scheduled for February 2025.

== Exhibits ==
The museum's exhibits include hologram projections of Gregory "Sugar Bear" Elliot from Experience Unlimited and Anwan Glover from the go-go group the "BackYard Band" and HBO's The Wire.

The museum also has memorabilia from several go-go acts, including jackets from Rare Essence and DJ Kool, wigs and outfits from Maiesha and the Hiphuggers, and cutouts of Chuck Brown.
