= Little Benny & the Masters =

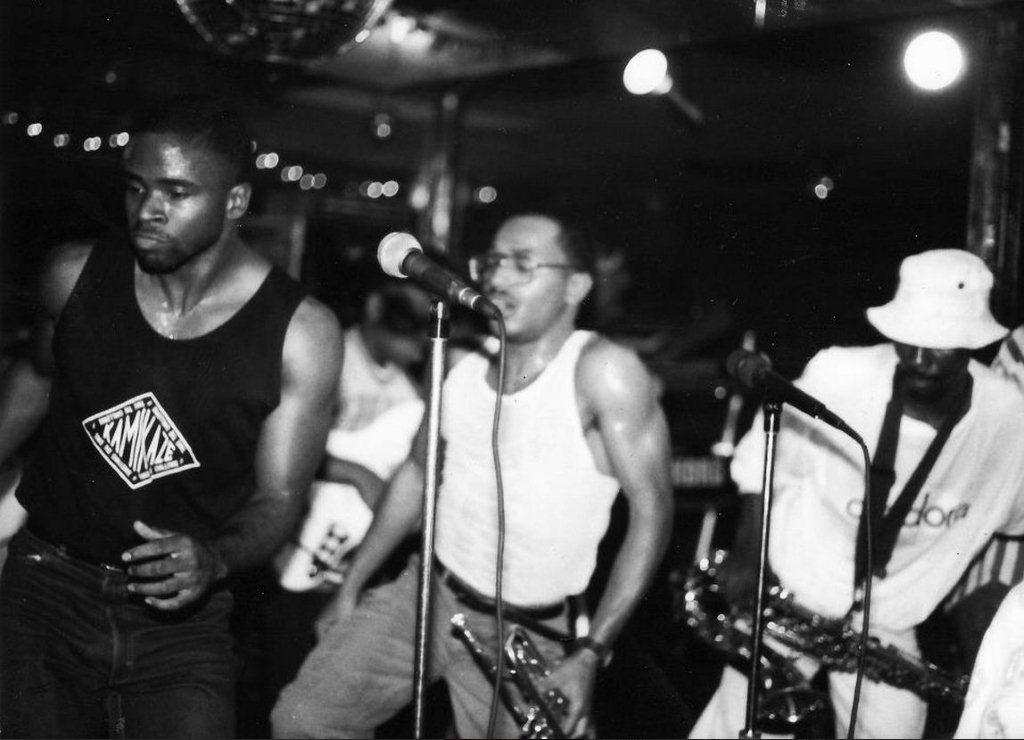

Background information
- Origin: Washington, D.C., United States
- Genre: Go-go
- Years active: 1984 - 2000
- Labels: Big City Records; Goff Records
- Past members: Benny Anthony Harley; Mark "Godfava" Lawson; Lowell Tucker; Tommy Crosby; Rick Holmes; Rick Wellman; Tyrone "Jungle Boogie" Williams; Scottie Haskel; John "Big Horn" Jones; Carl "CJ" Jones; Steve Colman; Vernon McDonald; Kevin "Kato" Hammond; Boolah Roper; Michael Baker; Keith Holmes; Reggie Thomas; Diane Borg; Dee Minor; Kim Anderson; William "Ju Ju" House; Elmo; Ivan Goff; Bolg; Stan Cooper; Bennie Dancy Jr. Keith Holmes; Glenn Ellis; Milton "Go-Go Mickey" Freeman; Michael Muse; Scottie Haskel; Bryant "Luther" Roberts; Darrien Grice; Roy Battle; James "Son" Thomas; Kent Wood; Go-Go Bouncey Nathaniel Marshall Lucas Sr; Chris Biondo; Alonzo Robinson; Bojak; Larnell "Whitney" Carr; Charles "Corleone" Garris; Darien Towns

Little Benny & the Masters were a Washington, D.C.–based go-go band that was formed in 1984.

== History ==
Trumpet player and vocalist Anthony Harley ("Little Benny") was a member of Rare Essence when he formed Little Benny & the Masters in 1986. The band had a major hit with the single "Who Comes to Boogie", which reached No. 33 in the UK Singles Chart in February 1985. The first album Cat in the Hat was released in 1987, after which the band went through many line-up changes.

== Discography ==
=== Studio albums ===
- Cat in the Hat (1987)
- "Little Benny Take Me Out To The Go-Go Live" (1992)
- Gett Your Drink On (1997)

=== Live albums ===
- "Little Benny Gettin' Funky Up In Here" (1991)
- Live at the Cafe (2000)

=== Singles ===
- "Who Comes to Boogie" (1984)
- "The King" (1988)
- "Gett Your Drink On" (1997)
