= School Daze Revisited =

Studio album by E.U. & Friends
- Released: September 18, 2007
- Genre: Go-go; R&B
- Length: 58:57
- Label: Teddy Bear Records
- Producer: Peter Dean (exec.); Ted Hopkins (exec.)

E.U. & Friends chronology
Make Money (1996)	School Daze Revisited (2007)

School Daze Revisited (also titled as School Daze Revisited...20 Years later) is a studio album released on September 18, 2007, by the Washington, D.C.–based go-go band E.U. & Friends. The album was dedicated to the Class of 1988.

== Track listing ==
No.	Title	Length
1.	"Step Show 1" (featuring E.U. Step Team)	0:25
2.	"GoGo Girlz (Work It)" (featuring Lady Day)	4:17
3.	"Lights Off" (featuring Duv Sac)	4:23
4.	"Ain't No Way" (featuring Shorty Corleone)	4:44
5.	"Butterflies" (featuring Pretty Boy)	5:42
6.	"Quickie Remix" (featuring The Lady Day Experience)	3:43
7.	"My Paradise" (featuring Earl Carter)	5:08
8.	"Da Butt 2008" (featuring Gregory "Sugar Bear" Elliott)	3:43
9.	"Blow This Joint" (featuring Ajani Sekou)	3:33
10.	"Would You" (featuring Annie Sidley)	3:45
11.	"Road Trip" (featuring Duv Sac)	4:35
12.	"You Don't Know My Name" (featuring Shy Thoro)	3:38
13.	"It's Like That (Go-Go Mix)" (featuring Sweet Cherie)	3:40
14.	"DCDC" (featuring Shorty Corleone)	4:25
15.	"War" (featuring Thunda)	3:04
Total length:		58:57

== Personnel ==
- Gregory "Sugar Bear" Elliott – vocals
- Ajani Sekou – vocals
- Earl Carter – vocals
- Shorty Corleone – vocals
- Duv Sac – vocals
- The Lady Day Experience – vocals
- Pretty Boy – vocals
- Shy Thoro – vocals
- Sweet Cherie – vocals
- Thunda – vocals
- Mike Corbett – composer
- Paul Minor – mixing
- Annie Sidley – composer, vocals
- Steve Sidley – composer
