= Reunion (Junk Yard Band album) =

Live album by Junk Yard Band
- Released: April 1, 1996
- Genre: Go-go
- Length: 30:28
- Label: Street; Liaison
- Producer: Moe Shorter

Junk Yard Band chronology
Creepin' Thru Da Hoodz (1994)	Reunion (1996)	Go Hard (1996)

Reunion is a live album released on April 1, 1996 by the Washington, D.C.-based go-go band Junk Yard Band. The album was recorded live in December 1995 at the Martin's Crosswinds Ballroom in Greenbelt, Maryland. It consists of ten tracks, including the songs "Sardines", "The Word", "Tiddy Balls", and "Hee Haw".

== Track listing ==
1. "Intro" (featuring Don "Black Pooh" Cornelius) – 1:24
2. "The Word" (Steve Harrison/R. Smith) – 3:33
3. "Sardines" (Steve Harrison/M.C./R. Smith) – 2:29
4. "Hee Haw" – 3:18
5. "Ruff-It-Off" – 5:30
6. "Tiddy Balls" – 3:11
7. "Here Come the Freaks" – 3:56
8. "Uh Oh" – 2:27
9. "Exit Theme" – 0:55
10. "Good Night, Good Morning – 3:46
