= Norman Cook discography =

British discography of Norman Cook

This article is for the discography of English DJ and producer Norman Cook, better known as Fatboy Slim, amongst many other stage names.

== As Norman Cook ==
Norman started off with a vinyl entitled "D.J. Mega-Mix Vol. 1" (also known as "The Finest Ingredients"), released in 1986. It consists of several tracks and dialogue from various sources edited together into a continuous piece. The following tracks were featured:

1. Ram Jam, "Black Betty" (1977)
2. The Magic Disco Machine, "Scratchin'" (1975)
3. Funk, Inc., "Kool is Back" (1971)
4. BBC Records, "Genesis of the Daleks" (1979)
5. Jay Livingston, "Mister Ed" (1961)
6. G.L.O.B.E. & Whiz Kid, "Play That Beat Mr. D.J." (1983)
7. The Beatles, "I Saw Her Standing There" (1963)
8. Whodini, "The Haunted House of Rock" (1983)
9. Run-DMC, "Jam Master Jay" (1984)
10. Whodini, "Escape (I Need a Break)" (1984)
11. Run-DMC, "Sucker M.C.'s" (1983)
12. The Mohawks, "The Champ" (1968)
13. Don Pardo, "We Interrupt This Program...News Medley" (1985)
14. Full Force, "Alice, I Want You Just For Me" (1985)
15. Indeep, "Last Night a D.J. Saved My Life" (1983)
16. Led Zeppelin, "Black Dog" (1971)
17. Led Zeppelin, "When the Levee Breaks" (1971)
18. The Gap Band, "Burn Rubber on Me (Why You Wanna Hurt Me)" (1980)
19. Jazzy Jay, "Def Jam" (1985)
20. Little Richard, "Tutti Frutti" (1955)
21. Fab Five Freddy, "Change the Beat" (1982)
22. Cerrone, "Rocket in the Pocket" (1978)
23. Kool & the Gang, "Funky Stuff" (1973)
24. J. Walter Negro and The Loose Jointz, "Shoot The Pump" (1981)
25. Trouble Funk, "Pump Me Up" (1982)
26. David Vorhaus, "ORCH5" (1982)
27. Afrika Bambaataa and Soulsonic Force, "Planet Rock" (1982)
28. Kraftwerk, "Numbers" (1981)
29. UB40, "Rat in Mi Kitchen" (1986)
30. Little Benny & the Masters, "Who Comes to Boogie" (1984)
31. The Fat Boys, "Human Beat Box" (1984)
32. Ennio Morricone, "The Good, the Bad and the Ugly" (1966)
33. The Jimmy Castor Bunch, "King Kong" (1975)
34. The Jimmy Castor Bunch, "The Return of Leroy Pt. 1" (1977)
35. Nelson Riddle, "To the Batmobile" (1966)
36. Malcolm McLaren and The World's Famous Supreme Team, "Buffalo Gals" (1982)
37. Phil Harris, "Happy Ending" from The Jungle Book (1967)

=== Singles ===
Year	Title	Peak chart positions	
Year	Title	UK	NZ
1989	"Won't Talk About It"/"Blame It on the Bassline"^{[II]}	29	36
1989	"For Spacious Lies"	48	-

=== Compilation albums ===
Year	Details
1995	Southern Fried House: A compilation of songs originally released under Cook's pseudonyms "Mighty Dub Katz", "Sunny Side Up" and "Yum Yum Head Food", and his band Pizzaman.; Label: Smile Communications; Released: 1998; Format: CD
1998	Skip to My Loops: A collection of samples aimed at DJs.; Label: AMG; Released: 1998 (originally released in 1992); Format: CD
2001	A Break from the Norm: A collection of tracks sampled on Fatboy Slim songs.; Label: Gut; Released: 2001; Format: CD, LP
2006	The Ultimate DJ Sample Box (with Paul Oakenfold): Label: Hypnotic; Released: 2006; Format: CD

=== Remixes ===
- Eric B. & Rakim - "I Know You Got Soul" (1987)
- James Brown - "She's the One" (1988)
- James Brown - "Payback" (1988)
- The Osmonds - "One Bad Apple" (1988)
- Kid 'n Play - "Do This My Way" (1988)
- Vanessa Williams - "The Right Stuff" (1988)
- Rebel MC and Double Trouble - "Street Tuff" (1989)
- Mahlathini and the Mahotella Queens - "Kazet" (1989)
- The Real Roxanne - "Roxanne's on a Roll" (1989)
- Fine Young Cannibals - "I'm Not the Man I Used to Be" (1989)
- Jungle Brothers - "Doin' Our Own Dang" (1990)
- Stetsasonic - "A.F.R.I.C.A." (1990)
- Kings of Swing - "Nod Your Head to This" (1990)
- Digital Underground - "The Humpty Dance" (1990)
- Roé - "Soledad" (1990)
- Piero Fidelfatti featuring Ronette - "Just Wanna Touch Me" (1990)
- Aztec Camera and Mick Jones - "Good Morning Britain" (1990)
- Keith Sweat - "Make You Sweat" (1990)
- Betty Boo - "24 Hours" (1990)
- Martay 'N' DBM - "Summertime" (1990)
- A Certain Ratio - "Won't Stop Loving You" (1990)
- A Tribe Called Quest - "I Left My Wallet in El Segundo" (1991)
- United Future Organization - "I Love My Baby" (1992)
- Mondo Grosso - "Souffles H (Shuffle Your Wig)" (1993)
- Stretch & Vern - "I'm Alive" (1996)
- Cornershop - "Brimful of Asha" (1997)
- Stretch & Vern - "Get Up! Go Insane!" (1997)
- Wildchild - "Renegade Master" (1997)
- Pete Tong and Boy George - "I'm Alive" (1997)
- Jean-Jacques Perrey - "E.V.A." (1997)
- Donald Glaude - "La La La" (1997)
- Pierre Henry and Michel Colombier - "Psyché Rock" (1997)
- Mighty Dub Katz - "Magic Carpet Ride" (1997)
- Bassbin Twins - "Out of Hand" (1997)
- Christopher Just - "I'm a Disco Dancer (And a Sweet Romancer)" (1997)
- Lunatic Calm - "Roll the Dice" (1997)
- Tranquility Bass - "Lalala" (1997)
- Midfield General - "Devil in Sports Casual" (1997)
- Psychedeliasmith - "Dubby Jointy" (1997)
- Deeds Plus Thoughts - "The World's Made Up of This and That" (1997)
- FC Kahuna - "What Is Kahuna?" (1997)
- Sensateria - "Give Me My Auger Back" (1997)
- Beastie Boys - "Body Movin'" (1998)
- Bootsy Collins - "Party's Lick-a-ble's" (1998)
- Kulay, "Burn" (1998)
- Peplab, "Ride the Pony" (1998)
- Phats & Small - "Turn Around" (1999)
- Groove Armada - "I See You Baby" (1999)
- Underworld - "King of Snake" (1999)
- Delakota - "C'mon Cincinnati" (1999)
- Outkast - "So Fresh, So Clean" (2000)
- Underworld - "Born Slippy" (2000)
- Macy Gray - "Sexual Revolution" (2001)
- Timo Maas - "To Get Down" (2001)
- Raven Maize - "The Real Life" (2001)
- Marcus Nikolai - "Bushes" (2001)
- Mike & Charlie - "I Get Live" (2001)
- X-Press 2 featuring David Byrne - "Lazy" (2002)
- All Saints - "Pure Shores" (2002)
- Missy Elliott featuring Ludacris - "Gossip Folks" (2002)
- The Chemical Brothers - "Come with Us" (2002)
- Playgroup - "Front 2 Back" (2002)
- Carter Burwell - "Adaptation" (2002)
- Pure Orange - "Feel Alive" (2002)
- Scissor Sisters - "Comfortably Numb" (2003)
- The Rolling Stones - "Sympathy for the Devil" (2003)
- Ludacris - "Stand Up" (2003)
- Röyksopp - "Eple" (2003)
- Electric Six - "Dance Commander" (2003)
- Maximus - "Follow Me Follow Me (Quem Que Caguetou?)" (2003)
- The Mock Turtles - "Can You Dig It?" (2003)
- Jem - "Just a Ride" (2004)
- Max Sedgley - "Happy" (2004)
- RED - "Release the Pressure" (2005)
- Deekline and Ed Solo - "Touch Your Toes" (2005)
- Tom Boxer - "Caciula P-o Ureche" (2005)
- Jim Noir - "Eanie Meany" (2006)
- The Rolling Stones - "I'm Free" (2007)
- The Charmers - "Skinhead Train" (2007)
- The Young Punx - "You've Got To..." (2007)
- Batida Do Corpo - "Amazonas" (2007)
- Dan le Sac Vs Scroobius Pip - "Thou Shalt Always Kill" (2007)
- Aldo Vanucci - "When I See You Smile" (2007)
- The Automatic - "Monster" (2007)
- The Mighty Underdogs featuring Casual - "Laughing at You" (2008)
- Benny Benassi, Helena, and Acid Jack - "Bust 'Em Up (Na Ciphra)" (2011)
- Ninetoes - "Finder" (2016)
- The Charlatans - "Trouble Understanding" (2016)
- Lime Cordiale and Idris Elba - "Holiday" (2022)
- Pizzaman and Lexa Hill - "Sex on the Streets" (2023)

== The Housemartins ==
- London 0 Hull 4 (1986)
- The People Who Grinned Themselves to Death (1987)

== Beats International ==
- Let Them Eat Bingo (1990)
- Excursion on the Version (1991)

== Freak Power ==
- Drive-Thru Booty (1994)
- More of Everything for Everybody (1996)

== Pizzaman ==
- Pizzamania (1995)

== As Fatboy Slim ==
- Better Living Through Chemistry (1996)
- You've Come a Long Way, Baby (1998)
- Halfway Between the Gutter and the Stars (2000)
- Palookaville (2004)

== As The Brighton Port Authority ==
=== Studio albums ===
Year	Details	Peak chart positions
Year	Details	UK
2009	I Think We're Gonna Need a Bigger Boat: Label: Southern Fried; Released: 6 January 2009; Format: CD, LP	156

=== Singles ===
Year	Title	Peak chart positions		Album
Year	Title	UK	BEL (F)	Album
2008	"Toe Jam" (featuring Dizzee Rascal and David Byrne)	198	8^{[I]}	I Think We're Gonna Need a Bigger Boat
2008	"Seattle" (featuring Emmy the Great)	—	—	I Think We're Gonna Need a Bigger Boat
2009	"He's Frank (Slight Return)" (featuring Iggy Pop)	—	—	I Think We're Gonna Need a Bigger Boat
2009	"Should I Stay or Should I Blow" (featuring Ashley Beedle)	—	—	I Think We're Gonna Need a Bigger Boat
"—" denotes releases that did not chart.
