= Live at Safari Club =

Live album by Junk Yard Band
- Released: 1989
- Genre: Go-go
- Length: 48:23
- Label: Street; Liaison
- Producer: Reo Edwards; Moe Shorter

Junk Yard Band chronology
The Word & Sardines (1986)	Live at Safari Club (1989)	Don't Sleep on Us (1991)

Live at Safari Club is a live album released in 1989 by the Washington, D.C.-based go-go band Junk Yard Band. The album was recorded live at the Safari Club in Northeast, Washington, D.C., and consists of ten tracks including the songs "I Wanna Rock" and "Take Me Out to See Junkyard". The album was digitally remastered and re-released on January 3, 1997.

== Track listing ==
1. "Here We Go!" – 6:03
2. "Work Youngen" – 4:14
3. "Roll Wit da Flow" – 6:44
4. "I Wanna Rock" – 4:06
5. "Knock 'Em Out the Box" – 2:36
6. "Prelude to Take Me Out" – 1:18
7. "Take Me Out to See Junkyard" ("The Hee-Haw Song") – 7:06
8. "Who Checked in ? (Freak-A-Deak Theme)" – 7:02
9. "Let the Beat Roll (Treat Her Like a Prostitute Theme)" – 4:42
10. "Thanx for Comin' Out!" – 4:32
