= Free Yourself =

Free Yourself may refer to:

== Music ==
=== Albums ===
- Free Yourself, a 1994 Gospel LP by Don Potter
- Free Yourself (Experience Unlimited album), a studio album released in 1977 by Experience Unlimited
- Free Yourself (Fantasia album), a 2004 album by Fantasia

=== Songs ===
- "Free Yourself", a 1985 single by The Untouchables
- "Free Yourself", a song by Chaka Khan from the soundtrack of To Wong Foo, Thanks for Everything! Julie Newmar
- Free Yourself (Fantasia song), a song by Fantasia from the album with the same name
- "Free Yourself", a 2018 single by Chemical Brothers included in their 2019 album, No Geography
- Free Yourself (Jessie Ware song), a 2022 single released by British singer-songwriter Jessie Ware
- "Free Yourself, Be Yourself", a song by the Brothers Johnson from Right on Time
