= Rock Yuh Butt =

Studio album by E.U.
- Released: 1988
- Studio: Sigma Sound, Philadelphia, Pennsylvania
- Genre: Go-go; old-school hip hop
- Length: 32:59
- Label: Go Go USA; T.T.E.D. Records; Island Records
- Producer: Maxx Kidd (exec); Roland Kidd (exec); Gerard Butler; Glen Ellis

E.U. chronology
Go Ju Ju Go (1987)	Rock Yuh Butt (1988)	Livin' Large (1989)

Professional ratings
Review scores
Source	Rating
AllMusic	3/5 stars
ARTISTdirect	2.5/5 stars
Robert Christgau	B

Rock Yuh Butt is a 1988 studio album released by the Washington, D.C.–based go-go band E.U.

== Track listing ==
Side A

1. "Rock Yuh Butt" (12" version) – (14:02)
2. "Rock Yuh Butt" (radio version, short) – (5:38)

Side B

1. "Go-Go in the Sunshine" (Mike Hughes /Roy Ayers) – (5:12)
2. "E.U. Freeze" (Gregory Elliot / Vernon McDonald) – (9:07)
3. "Roll Call" (featuring TTED All-stars) – (3:48)

== Personnel ==
- Gregory "Sugar Bear" Elliott – vocals, bass guitar
- William "Ju Ju" House – drums
- Genairo "Foxxy" Brown Foxx – congas, percussion
- Timothy "Short Tim" Glover – percussion
- Ivan Goff – keyboards
- Valentino "Tino" Jackson – electric guitar
- Darryel "Tidy Boy" Hayes – trumpet
- Michal "Go Go Mike" Taylor – trombone
