= Livin' Large (Experience Unlimited album) =

Studio album by E.U.
- Released: February 28, 1989
- Recorded: 1988
- Genres: Go-go; hip-hop; new jack swing
- Length: 48:54
- Label: Virgin
- Producers: Gregory Elliot (exec); Ted Hopkins; Johnny Mercer

E.U. chronology
| Rock Yuh Butt (1988) | Livin' Large (1989) | Cold Kickin' It (1990) |

Singles from Livin' Large
- 1. "Buck Wild" Released: 1989; 2. "Livin' Large" Released: 1989; 3. "Taste of Your Love" Released: 1989

Professional ratings
Review scores
| Source | Rating |
|---|---|
| AllMusic | 3/5 stars |
| ARTISTdirect | 2.5/5 stars |
| musicHound R&B | (4/5) |
| The New York Times | (favorable) |
| People | 2.5/4 stars |
| Robert Christgau | A− |
| The Washington Post | (favorable) |

Livin' Large is a studio album by Washington, D.C.–based go-go band E.U. It was released on February 28, 1989, through Virgin Records. The album included the charting singles "Buck Wild", "Livin' Large", and "Taste of Your Love". This album also includes the 1988 hip-hop/go-go song "Shake Your Thang", a collaboration with Salt-N-Pepa which was previously released on their 1988 album A Salt with a Deadly Pepa.

== Track listing ==
| No. | Title | Writer(s) | Length |
|---|---|---|---|
| 1. | "Buck Wild" | William "Ju Ju" House; Kent Wood | 4:01 |
| 2. | "Livin' Large" | Larry Robinson; Kipper Jones | 6:04 |
| 3. | "Shake Your Thang" | O'Kelly Isley; Ronald Isley; Rudolph Isley | 4:01 |
| 4. | "Taste of Your Love" | Marvin Ennis | 5:55 |
| 5. | "Shaka Zulu" | Michael Taylor; Gregory Elliott; Ivan Goff; J. Mercer; D. Gussom | 4:13 |
| 6. | "Come to the Go-Go" | Larry Robinson; Kipper Jones | 4:53 |
| 7. | "Shake It Like a White Girl" | Larry Robinson; Kipper Jones | 3:39 |
| 8. | "Da Butt 89" | Marcus Miller; Mark Stevens | 5:28 |
| 9. | "Don't Turn Around" | Patrick Adams | 6:21 |
| 10. | "Express" | William "Ju Ju" House; Kent Wood | 4:19 |
| Total length: | | | 48:54 |

== Charts ==
=== Album ===
| Chart (1989) | Peak position |
|---|---|
| Billboard Top R&B/Hip-Hop Albums | 22 |
| Billboard Pop Albums | 158 |

=== Singles ===
| Year | Title | Chart positions | |
| Year | Title | US Dance Maxi-Singles | US R&B |
|---|---|---|---|
| 1989 | "Buck Wild" | 47 | 7 |
| 1989 | "Livin' Large" | — | 63 |
| 1989 | "Taste of Your Love" | — | 4 |
