= 2 Places at the Same Time =

Live album by Experience Unlimited
- Released: 1986
- Venue: Irving Plaza (N.Y.C.)
- Genre: Go-go; old-school hip hop
- Length: 37:49
- Label: T.T.E.D. Records; Island Records
- Producer: Gregory Elliott(exec); Maxx Kidd (exec); Eric Thorngren

Experience Unlimited chronology
| Future Funk (1982) | 2 Places at the Same Time (1986) | Go Ju Ju Go (1987) |

Professional ratings
Review scores
| Source | Rating |
|---|---|
| AllMusic | 3/5 stars |
| Robert Christgau | B |
| The Rolling Stone Album Guide | 2/5 stars |

2 Places at the Same Time is a live album by the Washington, D.C.–based go-go band Experience Unlimited, released in 1986.

== Track listing ==
Side A

1. "N.Y. Comes to Boogie" – 19:11

Side B

1. "Sho Nuff Bumpin'" – 14:33
2. "The Theme from Escape from del Go-Go" – 4:05

== Personnel ==
- Gregory "Sugar Bear" Elliott – lead vocals, bass guitar
- William "Ju Ju" House – drums
- Genairo "Foxxy" Brown Foxx – congas, percussions
- Timothy "Short Tim" Glover – percussions
- Ivan Goff – keyboards
- Valentino "Tino" Jackson – electric guitar
- Darryel "Tidy Boy" Hayes – trumpet
- Michal "Go Go Mike" Taylor – trombone
