= Taste of Your Love =

Single by E.U.

from the album Livin' Large
- A-side: "Taste of Your Love"
- B-side: "Da Butt '89"
- Released: 1989
- Genre: Go-go; R&B; New jack swing
- Length: 5:55
- Label: Virgin Records
- Songwriter(s): Marvin Ennis and Harold Lloyd
- Producer(s): Marvin Ennis

E.U. singles chronology
"Buck Wild" (1989)	"Taste of Your Love" (1989)	"Livin' Large" (1989)

"Taste of Your Love" is a 1989 single released by the Washington, D.C.–based go-go band Experience Unlimited. The song was released as the second single from their 1989 album Livin' Large. The single peaked at No. 4 on Billboard's "Hot R&B/Hip-Hop songs" chart, on September 16, 1989.

== Track listing ==
A-Side

1. "Taste of Your Love" (LP Version) – 5:55
2. "Taste of Your Love" (Instrumental) – 5:54

B-Side

1. "Da Butt '89" – 5:28
