= Jams (album) =

Studio album by Northeast Groovers
- Released: December 12, 1995
- Genre: Go-go
- Length: 60:32
- Label: Future; Liaison
- Producer: Reo Edwards

Northeast Groovers chronology
Straight from the Basement (1994)	Jams (1995)	Northeast Coming (1999)

Jams (also titled as N.E.G. Jams) is a studio album released on December 12, 1995, by the Washington, D.C.-based go-go band Northeast Groovers. The album consists of ten tracks, including the singles "N.E.G Jam", "I Can See Clearly Now", and "Go Hard".

== Track listing ==
1. "N.E.G. Jam" – 6:41
2. "Freak-A-Dek Dug" – 5:43
3. "I Can See Clearly Now" – 8:00
4. "O' Yeah" – 4:39
5. "Like Mike" – 3:56
6. "Go Hard" – 5:17
7. "Get Your Hands in the Air" – 7:24
8. "Funky Now" – 4:05
9. "Scream On It" – 5:16
10. "Tear the Roof Off This Mutha" – 9:31

== Personnel ==
- Khari Pratt – bass guitar
- Lamond "Maestro" Perkins – keyboards
- Ronald "88" Utley – keyboards
- David "32" Ellis– vocals
- Leonard "Daddy-O" Huggins – vocals
- Ronald "Dig-Dug" Dixon – percussions
- Christian “Rah Rah" Black – vocals
- Samuel "Smoke" Dews – congas, percussions
- "Jammin" Jeff Warren – drums
