= Disco Dan =

Disco Dan may refer to:

- Darnell Glenn Ford or Dan Ford (born 1952), American former professional baseball player
- Cool "Disco" Dan (1969–2017), pseudonym of American graffiti artist Dan Hogg
- Disco Dan (video game), a 1984 ZX Spectrum game originally released by Gem Software, later reissued by Amstrad under the Sinclair brand
- Dan Bylsma (born 1970), American professional ice hockey coach, sometimes called "Disco Dan" as an inside joke
