= Northeast on Fire =

Studio album by Northeast Groovers
- Released: 1999
- Genre: Go-go
- Length: 74:35
- Label: Future; Liaison
- Producer: Lamond Perkins; Leonard Huggins

Northeast Groovers chronology
Northeast Coming (1999)	Northeast on Fire (1999)

Northeast on Fire is the third and final studio album by American go-go band Northeast Groovers. It was released in 1999.

== Track listing ==
No.	Title	Length
1.	"Lovely Day"	4:20
2.	"Hail Mary"	8:39
3.	"Pop Dat"	2:29
4.	"Let the Beat Work"	5:58
5.	"Buckle-Up"	5:36
6.	"Ruff Rider"	4:14
7.	"My Dawg"	7:15
8.	"Crank That"	4:24
9.	"Monster Jam"	6:39
10.	"The Bar"	0:25
11.	"Southside"	8:49
12.	"Bo Chel"	4:41
13.	"Fight"	2:42
14.	"Drop the Bomb"	4:26
15.	"Freak Nick Breeze"	3:58
Total length:		74:35

== Personnel ==
- Christian Black - Lead Vocals
- Khari Pratt – bass guitar
- Lamond "Maestro" Perkins – keyboards
- Ronald "88" Utley – keyboards
- Leonard "Daddy-O" Huggins – vocals
- Dave "32" Ellis - vocals
- Ronald "Dig-Dug" Dixon – vocals, percussions
- Larry "Stomp Dogg" Atwater – drummer
- Samuel "Smoke" Dews – conga, percussions
