= The Beginning/The End =

Live album by Junk Yard Band
- Released: 1999
- Genre: Go-go
- Length: 40:44
- Label: Street; Liaison
- Producer: Reo Edwards; Moe Shorter

Junk Yard Band chronology
Go-Hard (1996)	The Beginning/The End (1999)	Y'all Don't Understand (2000)

The Beginning/The End is a live album released in 1999 by the Washington, D.C.–based go-go band Junk Yard Band. The album consists of thirteen tracks, including the songs "Boot Camp Clik", "Freak Body Baby", and "Use Me". It is narrated by Maurice "Moe" Shorter. The album won the 2000 Washington Area Music Award for best go-go recording.

== Track listing ==
A Side

1. "The Beginning/The Story" – 2:40
2. "Streets to Commercials to Clubs" – 2:09
3. "Def Jam/On Tour" – 0:37
4. "Hey Moe, Let's Go Pro" – 1:44
5. "The Good Life to Thug Life" – 0:43
6. "Boot Camp Clik" – 4:43
7. "Freak Body Baby" – 6:01

B Side

1. "Lighter Lite" (Ibex Theme) – 5:20
2. "Do Dat, Do Dat" – 4:49
3. "Socket Beat" – 1:37
4. "Use Me" – 5:40
5. "Pitty Pat" – 3:43
6. "The Beginning/The End" (Narration) – 0:58
