= Don't Sleep on Us =

Live album by Junk Yard Band
- Released: 1991
- Genre: Go-go
- Length: 53:39
- Label: Street; Liaison
- Producer: Reo Edwards; Moe Shorter

Junk Yard Band chronology
Live at Safari Club (1989)	Don't Sleep on Us (1991)	Creepin' Thru Da Hoodz (1994)

Don't Sleep on Us is a live album released in 1991 by the Washington, D.C.–based go-go band Junk Yard Band. The album consists of thirteen tracks, including the songs "Heavy One", "Cold Crankin'", and "Take Me Out to See Junkyard".

== Track listing ==
A Side

1. "Let Us Get On Down" – 4:52
2. "Cold Crankin'" – 7:53
3. "Heavy One" – 7:17
4. "Make No Fuss" – 4:27

B Side

1. "Ha Ha, Yuck Yuck Yuck Yah" – 6:53
2. "I Want to Be Loved" – 6:08
3. "(You're) Jigglin' Baby" – 6:45
4. "Tear the House Down" – 4:37
5. "Take Me Out to See Junkyard" – 4:34
