= Creepin' Thru Da Hoodz =

Live album by Junk Yard Band
- Released: March 24, 1994
- Genre: Go-go
- Length: 61:17
- Label: Street; Liaison
- Producer: Moe Shorter

Junk Yard Band chronology
| Don't Sleep on Us (1989) | Creepin' Thru Da Hoodz (1994) | Reunion 95 (1995) |

Creepin' Thru Da Hoodz is a live album released on March 24, 1994 by the Washington, D.C.-based go-go band Junk Yard Band. The album consists of nine tracks, including the songs "Heavy One", "John Wayne" and "Loose Booty".

== Track listing ==
A Side

1. "John Wayne" – 8:04
2. "Loose Booty" – 4:59
3. "Let It Ride Socket Beat" – 9:14
4. "Clap to the Beat" – 6:16
5. "Block-Block"/"One Leg Up"/"Let the Beat Go"/"Uh-Oh" (The Rippa Medley) – 9:49

B Side

1. "Beef Jerky Time" – 5:29
2. "Ruff-It-Off" – 8:16
3. "Ruff-It-Off" – 4:52
4. "Heavy One" – 4:19
