= Free Yourself (Experience Unlimited album) =

Studio album by Experience Unlimited
- Released: 1977
- Recorded: July 29, 1976
- Genre: Go-go; soul; jazz-funk
- Length: 40:05
- Label: Black Fire; P-Vine
- Producer: Charles C. Stephenson; Jimmy Gray

Experience Unlimited chronology
Free Yourself (1977)	Future Funk (1982)

Professional ratings
Review scores
Source	Rating
AllMusic	4/5 stars
Robert Christgau	B
musicHound R&B	(3/5)

Free Yourself is the debut studio album released in 1977 by the Washington, D.C.-based go-go band Experience Unlimited.

== Track listing ==
Side A

1. "It's All Imagination" – 3:26
2. "Functus" – 4:51
3. "Peace Gone Away" – 4:47
4. "Free Yourself" – 8:03

Side B

1. "Hey You" – 3:40
2. "People" – 6:10
3. "Funky Consciousness" – 9:08

== Personnel ==
- Gregory "Sugar Bear" Elliott – vocals, bass guitar
- Anthony "Block" Easton – drums
- Andre "Pops" Lucas – congas, percussion
- Michael "Professeur Funk" Hughes – keyboards
- Phillip Harris – trumpet
- Clarence "Oscar" Smith – saxophone
- Greyline T. Hunter – trombone
