= Beam me up, Scotty =

Misquotation from Star Trek

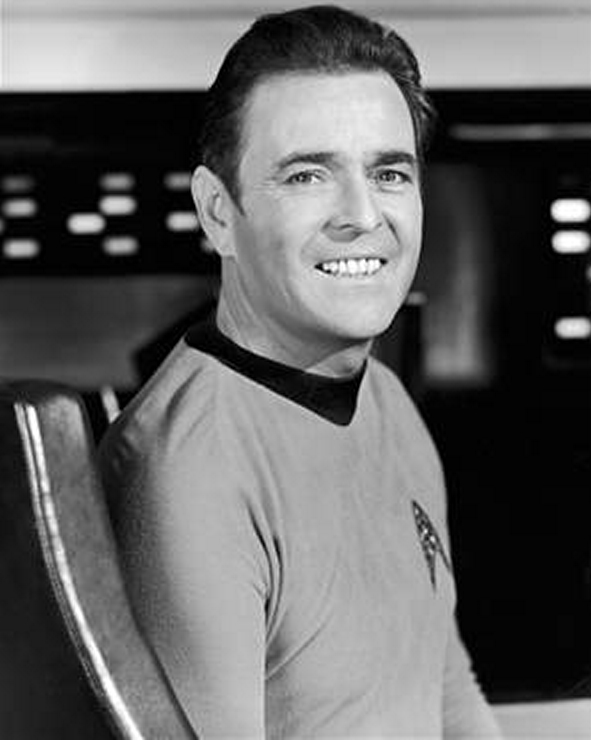
- Photo of James Doohan as Scotty from the original Star Trek series.
- Character: James T. Kirk
- Actor: William Shatner
- First used in: Star Trek: The Original Series, though not verbatim

"Beam me up, Scotty" is a catchphrase and misquotation that made its way into popular culture from the science fiction television series Star Trek: The Original Series. It comes from the command Captain Kirk gives his chief engineer, Montgomery "Scotty" Scott, when he needs to be "transported" back to the Starship Enterprise.

Though it has become irrevocably associated with the series and films, the exact phrase was never actually spoken in any Star Trek television episode or film. Despite this, the quote has become a phrase of its own over time. It can be used to describe one's desire to be elsewhere, technology such as teleportation, slang for certain drugs, or as a phrase to show appreciation and association with the television show.

The misquotation's influence led to James Doohan, the actor who played Scotty, to be misrepresented in his own obituary, where he is referenced as the character who "responded to the command, 'Beam me up, Scotty.'" Doohan himself chose to use the phrase as the title of his 1996 autobiography.

== Precise quotations ==
Despite the phrase entering into popular culture, it is a misquotation and has never been said in any of the television series or films, contrary to popular belief. There have, however, been several "near misses" of phrasing.

In the Original Series episodes "The Gamesters of Triskelion" and "The Savage Curtain", Kirk said, "Scotty, beam us up"; while in the episode "This Side of Paradise", Kirk simply said, "Beam me up". In the episode "The Cloud Minders", Kirk says, "Mr. Scott, beam us up".

The animated episodes "The Lorelei Signal" and "The Infinite Vulcan" used the phrasing "Beam us up, Scotty".

The original film series has the wording "Scotty, beam me up" in Star Trek IV: The Voyage Home and "Beam them out of there, Scotty" in Star Trek Generations.

The complete phrase was eventually said by William Shatner in the audio adaptation of his non-canon novel Star Trek: The Ashes of Eden.

== Legacy ==
The popularity of the misquotation has led to many new phrases, both associated with Star Trek or otherwise. The exact timing of when the phrase became popular is unclear. However, early signs of the quote's usage to describe something separate from Star Trek can be found roughly ten years after Star Trek's airing in 1966, in a publication of the Royal Aeronautical Journal. It describes a certain routine as "a sort of 'beam me up Scotty' routine". Over time, the phrase has been extended to, "Beam me up, Scotty, there's no intelligent life down here!", popularized on bumper stickers and t-shirts, despite neither quote ever being said on the show.

The quote "Beam me up, Scotty!" has been extended beyond its original meaning to describe an expression of "the desire to be elsewhere", or the desire to be out of an unwanted situation. Furthermore, it has been associated with things that are futuristic, such as the possibility of teleportation.

The phrase has also been used as slang for certain drugs. An Oxford Reference page defined "Beam me up, Scotty" as "a mixture of phencyclidine and cocaine" and to "talk to Scotty", "high off Scotty", "see Scotty", etc. The phrase has been referenced by Baxter County Sheriff's drug slang definitions. It is also referenced in the book "Vice Slang" by Tom Dalzell and Terry Victor, for crack cocaine, and to describe "Beamers" or "Beemers" as those taking said drugs.

James Traficant used the quote as a catchphrase during his service in the U.S. House of Representatives.

== In popular culture ==
- The variant "Scotty, beam me up" occurs in the 1987 parody song "Star Trekkin'".
- In 1988, D.C. Scorpio released a song named after the quote.
- A character in the 1993 educational video game Where in Space is Carmen Sandiego? is named "Bea Miupscotti".
- The planetarium in the animated series South Park (1997) carries the inscription "Me transmitte sursum, Caledoni!", which is a translation of the misquotation into Latin.
- The quote was used in the movie Armageddon (1998) by Rockhound, the character played by Steve Buscemi. When asked by Harry S. Stamper (played by Bruce Willis) if Rockhound would join them to divert the asteroid, he replies "You know me. Beam me up, Scotty."
- Relient K quote the phrase in a song called "Beaming" on The Nashville Tennis EP.
- The quote was also used by American rapper Nicki Minaj as the title of both her third mixtape and its final track.
- In his book Based on a True Story, Norm Macdonald explains that the doorman of the building he was living in addressed him as "Beam me up, Scotty" after Norm said the line in a Star Trek sketch on the show Saturday Night Live.
- Mateo uses the quote in the Superstore episode "Part-Time Hires" when he is speaking to a construction worker named Scott who continues to try to use his employee bathroom pass.

== See also ==
- Misquotations
