= Kevin Kato Hammond =

American journalist

Kevin "Kato" Hammond
- Born: Kevin Hammond; August 13, 1965 (age 61); Washington DC
- Citizenship: US
- Education: Bowie State
- Occupations: Musician, Author, Actor, Publisher, Journalist, Filmmaker
- Writing career
- Pen name: Kato
- Genre: The Go-Go Culture
- Notable works: Creator of TMOTTGoGo (Take Me Out To The Go-Go) Magazine & TMOTTGoGo Radio
- Website: katohammond.com

Kevin Kato Hammond is an American musician, author, publisher and journalist. He is the owner and creator of Take Me Out To The Go-Go, Inc. (TMOTTGoGo), editor and publisher of Take Me Out To The Go-Go Magazine, executive producer of TMOTTGoGo DVD Magazine, and webmaster of TMOTTGoGo.com. Take Me Out to the Go-Go Magazine gains attention from outside media outlets for its designation as "the official gateway to a Washington, DC music culture." Such magazines as Vibe have made Kevin Hammond and Take Me Out to the GoGo Magazine a significant source of information about the go-go music culture. His history as a musician includes performing and recording with the go-go bands Pure Elegance, Little Benny & the Masters, and Proper Utensils. Most recently he has served as co-music director of Fatal Attraction Band.

Kato is currently the director of marketing for Bag of Beats Records. He is also the chairperson for history and archives for The GoGo Coalition.

Born in Washington, DC, Kevin "Kato" Hammond grew up in Seat Pleasant, Maryland, and attended the Duke Ellington School of the Arts in Washington, DC and Bowie High School in Bowie, Maryland. As a child, he performed in DC area organizations such as CUE (Children's Urban Arts Ensemble), Bren-Carr Dancers and The T-N-T Poppers. Hammond is also a playwright. At the age of 17, he wrote a play entitled Buddies that listed in the finalist division of the Young Playwrights Inc. Young Playwrights Festival at the Public Theater. This play was performed Off-Broadway and starred Denzel Washington and Anna Maria Horsford, both of whom were lesser known actors at the time.

== Take Me Out To The Go-Go (TMOTTGoGo) ==
Hammond started the online magazine Take Me Out To The Go-Go in 1996. In addition to the magazine being a source of information on go-go shows, it serves as a community forum in which go-go fans routinely submit their own articles on issues unique to the genre. Take Me Out To The Go-Go has expanded to include a radio station entitled TMOTTRadio.com, as well as a Web & Graphics Designing Service.

== TMOTTGoGo Radio ==
Although producing online radio programs since 1998, in January 2012 Hammond brought the debut of TMOTTRadio.com. The full broadcast platform of the station went into live programming in September 2014. This addition to the TMOTT platform showcased programmed shows such as, 99 & Kato Radio Experience, The Adverbs, DaBizNest, Wisdom Speeks DC, The Know It Alls, Bubble Guts Radio, TMOTT Old School Show, Throwback Thursdays, Sunday's Praise, Purp Haze Show, The Bounce Zone, and The Grown & Sexy Side.

== Take Me Out To The Go-Go: The Autobiography of Kato Hammond ==
In May 2015, Hammond published his autobiography, Take Me Out To The Go-Go.

== Discography ==
Studio albums

- Little Benny & The Masters - Getting Funky Up In Here (1991)
- Little Benny & The Masters – Take Me Out To The Go-Go (1992)
- Fatal Attraction - Rock It For Shawn (1995)
- Fatal Attraction - Grown & Crankin (1996)
- Soul Food (2020)
- Universe City (2020)
- Acoustically Yours (2020)

== Filmography ==
=== Film ===
Year	Title	Role
2018	TMOTTGoGo Inside The Pocket	Himself
2018	Straight Crankin Documentary	Himself
2020	The Beat Don't Stop - TV One	Himself

=== Television ===
Year	Title	Role	Notes
2014	Washington In The 80s	Himself	WETA TV Series
2015	Unsung	Himself	Chuck Brown & GoGo
2018	Great Day Washington	Himself	Episode Date August 22
2018	The 202	Himself	TV series

== See also ==
- Go-Go Music
- Chuck Brown
- Anthony Harley
- Little Benny & the Masters
- Anwan Glover
- Experience Unlimited
- Trouble Funk
- Junk Yard Band
