= Northeast Coming =

Studio album by Northeast Groovers
- Released: 1999
- Genre: Go-go
- Length: 1:56:22
- Label: Listen Up; Liaison
- Producer: Lamond Perkins; Leonard Huggins

Northeast Groovers chronology
Jams (1995)	Northeast Coming (1999)	Northeast on Fire (1999)

Northeast Coming is a double studio album released in 1999 by the Washington, D.C.–based go-go band Northeast Groovers.

== Track listing ==
Disc One: The North Side
No.	Title	Length
1.	"Northeast Comin'"	1:36
2.	"They Party" (featuring G-Hatt, Daddy-O)	4:21
3.	"Streetlife" (featuring G-Hatt)	6:13
4.	"Your Mutha!"	1:11
5.	"Northeast Rock"	6:01
6.	"Booty Call Remix" (featuring Daddy-O, 751 Drew, Kadoe Sparks, Stinky Dink)	6:33
7.	"Your Fatha!"	2:39
8.	"Ayre Rayde Dedication" (featuring Daddy-O)	6:34
9.	"Sweetown" (featuring Black Book, Daddy-O)	4:32
10.	"The Diner Club"	1:27
11.	"Come On" (featuring Daddy-O)	5:13
12.	"The After Party"	1:35
13.	"The Symphony" (featuring "88", Khari, Maestro)	6:02

Disc Two: The East Side – Live at the Icebox!
No.	Title	Length
1.	"Lady on the Door"	0:46
2.	"I Roll..."	7:32
3.	"Get at Me Dug"	6:52
4.	"Live at the Box with Leon Jackson" (featuring Leon Jackson)	1:01
5.	"Goosebumps"	4:00
6.	"Dip! (Grabagirl)"	5:49
7.	"Erk, Jerk and Johnny Blaze"	2:50
8.	"Da' Rocket!"	6:31
9.	"Pop Dat Ass!"	7:00
10.	"Da Carry-Out"	1:07
11.	"Van Damme 99"	6:46
12.	"WKPNEG"	1:38
13.	"Off Da Muscle"	10:05
Total length:		1:56:22

== Personnel ==
- Khari Pratt – bass guitar
- Lamond "Maestro" Perkins – keyboards
- Ronald "88" Utley – keyboards
- Leonard "Daddy-O" Huggins – vocals
- Ronald "Dig-Dug" Dixon – percussions
- Larry "Stomp Dogg" Atwater – drummer
- Samuel "Smoke" Dews – congas, percussions
- David "32" Ellis – vocals
- Chris "rapper" Black – vocals
- Robert "rocket" Chase – percussions
