= Making Money (disambiguation) =

Making Money is a 2007 British novel by Terry Pratchett.

Making Money may also refer to:

- "Making Money", a 1940 short film by Indian filmmaker Ezra Mir
- "Making Money", a song from Ben Rector's 2013 album The Walking in Between

== See also ==
- Make Money, a 1996 album by E.U.
- Made of Money (disambiguation)
