= Go-Hard =

Live album by Junk Yard Band
- Released: November 12, 1996
- Genre: Go-go
- Length: 69:26
- Label: Street; Liaison
- Producer: Moe Shorter

Junk Yard Band chronology
Reunion (1996)	Go-Hard (1996)	The Beginning/The End (1999)

Go-Hard is a live album released on November 12, 1996 by the Washington, D.C.-based go-go band Junk Yard Band. The album consists of eleven tracks, including the songs "Tiddy Balls", "JY on the Rise", and "Go-Hard".

== Track listing ==
1. "Junk's Gettin' Down" – 6:00
2. "JY Funk"/"Crank That, Pt. 1" – 11:38
3. "Redrum" – 4:22
4. "This is the Year (Go-Hard)" – 8:34
5. "Here Come the Freaks" – 8:42
6. "Uuuh-Eee-Uhhh"/"Hootie Hootie" (The Rippa Medley, Pt. 2) – 4:02
7. "JY on the Rise (Wink & Dog)" (featuring Dre Dog) – 4:52
8. "Uh-Oh!" (It's Demi-Doc and Baker) – 5:24
9. "Tiddy Balls" – 6:48
10. "(Caught on Tape in the Studio)" – 2:39
11. "Tiddy Balls" / "Lights Out, Lets Play..." – 7:01
