= The Cat in the Hat (disambiguation) =

The Cat in the Hat is a 1957 book by Dr. Seuss.

The Cat in the Hat may also refer to:

- The Cat in the Hat (TV special), a 1971 animated musical adaptation
- The Cat in the Hat (2003 film), a live-action adaptation
- The Cat in the Hat (2026 film), an animated adaptation
- The Cat in the Hat (video game), a 2003 platformer based on the live-action film
- Cat in the Hat (Little Benny & the Masters album), 1987
- Cat in the Hat (Bobby Caldwell album), 1980

== See also ==
- The Cat in the Hat Comes Back, a 1958 sequel to the 1957 book
- The Cat in the Hat Knows a Lot About That!, a 2010 animated television series
