= Gett Your Drink On =

Studio album by Lil Benny & the Masters
- Released: July 15, 1997
- Genre: Go-go
- Length: 56:44
- Label: Hoop-Tee
- Producers: Anthony Harley (exec.); Warren Robinson (exec.); Milton Freeman

Lil Benny & the Masters chronology
Cat In the Hat (1987)	Gett Your Drink On (1997)	Live at the Cafe (2000)

Gett Your Drink On is a studio album originally released on July 15, 1997 by the Washington, D.C.–based go-go band Lil' Benny and the Masters.

== Track listing ==
1. "I Never Seen a Man Cry" (Jesse Johnson/Brad Jordan) – 5:13
2. "Brother to Brother" (Anthony Harley/William "Ju-Ju" House) – 7:23
3. "Hope" (Anthony Harley/William "Ju-Ju" House) – 2:54
4. "Hit and Run" – 1:46
5. "Let Me Show You/The Message" – 7:13
6. "How You Going to Carry It" – 6:20
7. "Gett on the Wagon" – 6:48
8. "Bellow-Meso-Bardo" (Chuck Brown) – 5:06
9. "Hello" (Chuck Brown) – 3:53
10. "Gett Your Drink On" (Greg Ellis/Louie Oxley) – 6:54
11. "Can I Get Down" – 4:37
12. "Walk" (Anthony Harley/Mark Lawson) – 5:50

== Personnel ==
- Anthony "Lil Benny" Harley – rapping, trumpet, vocals
- Stan Cooper – guitar
- Bennie Dancy Jr. – rapping, tenor saxophone, vocals
- Glenn Ellis – bass guitar
- Milton "Go-Go Mickey" Freeman – percussion
- William "Ju-Ju" House – drums Composer, Drums
- Mark Lawson – keyboards, synthesizer
- Bryant "Luther" Roberts – vocals
- James "Son" Thomas – rapping, background vocals
- Kent Wood – keyboards, mixing, synthesizer
- Chris Biondo – engineer, mixing
- Chuck Brown – guest vocals
- James "Jas Funk" – guest vocals
