= Straight from the Basement =

Studio album by Northeast Groovers
- Released: January 1, 1994
- Genre: Go-go
- Length: 1:16:54
- Label: Future; Liaison
- Producer: Reo Edwards

Northeast Groovers chronology
Straight from the Basement (1994)	Jams (1995)

Straight from the Basement (also titled as Straight from the Northeast) is a studio album released in 1994 by the Washington, D.C.–based go-go band Northeast Groovers. The consist of thirteen tracks, including the singles "Booty Call", "The Twenty Minute Workout", "Van Damme", and "The Water" (which samples "Aqua Boogie" by Parliament).

== Track listing ==
1. "Straight from the Basement" – 5:57
2. "Hey Ho (Live at Rick's)" – 10:38
3. "The Water" – 5:58
4. "Booty Call" – 7:66
5. "Come Here" – 4:42
6. "The Twenty Minute Workout" – 5:43
7. "Takin My Time" – 4:34
8. "24-7-365" – 4:07
9. "We Came to Party" – 7:09
10. "Ding A Ling Swing" – 5:03
11. "Mystery" – 5:35
12. "Van Damme" – 4:21
13. "Bounce to This" – 5:01

== Personnel ==
- Khari Pratt – bass guitar
- Lamond "Maestro" Perkins – keyboards
- David " 32" Ellis– vocals
- Leonard "Daddy-O" Huggins – vocals
- Ronald "Dig-Dug" Dixon – percussions
- Christia" Rapper" Black – vocals
- Samuel "Smoke" Dews – congas, percussions
- "Jammin" Jeff Warren – drums
