= Kevin Hammond =

Kevin Hammond may refer to:

- Kevin Hammond (singer-songwriter) (born 1985), American musician
- Kevin Kato Hammond (born 1965), American musician, author, and journalist
