= Live at the Cafe =

Studio album by Little Benny
- Released: September 26, 2000
- Genre: Go-go
- Length: 71:21
- Label: Hoop-Tee; Liaison
- Producer: Mark Lawson

Little Benny chronology
Gett Your Drink On (1997)	Live at the Cafe (2000)

Live at the Cafe (also titled as Live at the Cafe: Back in the Day) is a 2000 live album by the Washington, D.C.–based musician Little Benny.

== Track listing ==
1. "Lay It on Down" – 2:55
2. "What's My Name?" – 3:15
3. "Ladies Go Bop Bop" – 6:03
4. "Ten for Ten" – 0:46
5. "Whoa" – 5:12
6. "Camay – 6:29
7. "Take Me Out to the Go Go" – 6:53
8. "Roll Call" – 4:54
9. "Benny's Socket" – 0:43
10. "What You Want Me to Do" – 7:21
11. "Bojak" – 1:46
12. "Hit Me With the 1, 2" – 2:19
13. "Thong Song (Go Go Thongs) – 7:18
14. "Practice Makes Perfect" – 4:51
15. "It's So Hard" – 10:36

== Personnel ==
- Roy Battle – keyboards
- Bojak – percussion
- Larnell "Whitney" Carr – percussion
- Charles "Corleone" Garris – vocals
- Anthony "Lil Benny" Harley – trumpet, vocal
- Mark Lawson – keyboards
- Darien Towns – bass guitar
