= Beam Me Up, Scotty (D.C. Scorpio song) =

- album cover

Single by D.C. Scorpio
- Released: 1988
- Genre: hip-hop; go-go
- Length: 3:49 (radio version); 5:20 (long version)
- Label: I Hear Ya! Records
- Songwriter(s): D.C. Scorpio
- Producer(s): Michael Neal; Donnell Floyd; Elai Tubo; Ron Hunt

D.C. Scorpio singles chronology
"Stone Cold Hustler" (1987)	"Beam Me Up, Scotty" (1988)	"Stone Cold Hustler II" (1990)

"Beam Me Up, Scotty" is the second single released in 1988 by the Washington, D.C.–based hip-hop artist D.C. Scorpio. This single following his debut single Stone Cold Hustler. The song also appears on the 1988 compilation album The Go Go Posse.

== Track listing ==
Side-A

1. "Beam Me Up, Scotty" (radio version) – 3:49
2. "Beam Me Up, Scotty" (long version) – 5:20
3. "Beam Me Up, Scotty" (DC super dub) – 5:40

Side-B

1. "Beam Me Up, Scotty" (NYC mix) – 5:15
2. "Beam Me Up, Scotty" (NYC instrumental mix) – 5:09
3. "Beam Me Up, Scotty" (NYC club dub) – 4:15

== See also ==
- Hip hop in Washington, D.C.
