= School Daze (soundtrack) =

School Daze: Original Motion Picture Soundtrack

Soundtrack album by various artists
- Released: April 1988
- Recorded: Various dates
- Genre: R&B, musical, soul
- Length: 42:58
- Label: EMI America
- Producer: Raymond Jones; Bill Lee; Marcus Miller; Lenny White; Stevie Wonder

Singles from School Daze: Original Soundtrack Album
- 1. "Da Butt" Released: 1988

Professional ratings
Review scores
Source	Rating
AllMusic	4/5 stars

School Daze: Original Motion Picture Soundtrack is the music soundtrack album to Spike Lee's 1988 film School Daze. The soundtrack peaked at number 14 on the Billboard Top R&B Albums chart. The soundtrack features the songs "Da Butt" by E.U. and "Be Alone Tonight" which features Tisha Campbell. "Da Butt" became a number-one R&B/pop hit on the Billboard R&B Singles chart and peaked at number 35 on the Billboard Hot 100.

== Track listing ==
No.	Title	Performer(s)	Length
1.	"Da Butt"	E.U.	5:14
2.	"Perfect Match"	Tech & the Effx	6:03
3.	"Be Alone Tonight"	Tisha Campbell	3:56
4.	"Straight and Nappy"	Jigaboos & Wannabees Chorus	6:08
5.	"One Little Acorn"	Kenny Barron & Terence Blanchard	2:20
6.	"I'm Building Me a Home"	Morehouse College Glee Club	2:45
7.	"I Can Only Be Me"	Keith John	3:17
8.	"One Little Acorn" (Piano Solo)	Kenny Barron	1:21
9.	"Be One"	Phyllis Hyman	4:36
10.	"Wake Up Suite"	The Natural Spiritual Orchestra	3:40
11.	"We've Already Said Goodbye (Before We Said Hello)"	Pieces of a Dream	4:11

== Credits ==
- Executive producer — Spike Lee
- Producers — Marcus Miller (track 1), Lenny White (track 2), Raymond Jones (track 3), Bill Lee (tracks 4, 5, 6, 8, 9, 10), Stevie Wonder (track 7)

== Charts ==
Chart (1988)	Peak position
U.S. Billboard 200	81
U.S. Billboard Top R&B Albums	14

Singles

Year	Title	US Pop	US R&B	US Dance
1988	"Da Butt"	35	1	23
1988	"Be Alone Tonight"	—	83	—
