= Make Money =

Studio album by E.U.
- Released: 1996
- Genres: Go-go; hip hop soul; R&B
- Length: 68:54
- Label: Escape Records

E.U. chronology
Cold Kickin' It (1990)	Make Money (1996)	School Daze Revisited (2007)

Make Money is a studio album released in 1996 by the Washington, D.C.–based go-go band E.U.

== Track listing ==
No.	Title	Writer(s)	Length
1.	"Make Money"	Ivan Goff	5:18
2.	"Marinate"	Goff	4:53
3.	"Touch Me, Tease Me"	Mary J. Blige; Kenny Kornegay; Inga Marchand; Case Woodard; Daryl Young	7:49
4.	"Can't Go for That"	Sara Allen; Goff; Daryl Hall; John Oates	5:31
5.	"Ooh La La La"	Teena Marie; Rick James	8:08
6.	"Freddie's Dead"	Curtis Mayfield	6:18
7.	"Jump in the Line"	E.U.	5:25
8.	"I Can Tell (The Look In Your Eyes)"	Frankie Beverly; Goff	5:15
9.	"Hold You"	Ellis Merriman	3:44
10.	"The Girl Is Like That"	Beverly; Goff	4:17
11.	"Rudolph the Red-Nosed Reindeer"	Johnny Marks	5:15
12.	"Rudolph the Red-Nosed Reindeer"	Marks	3:32
13.	"Marinate"	Goff	3:29
Total length:			68:54

== Personnel ==
- Gregory "Sugar Bear" Elliott – vocals, bass guitar
- Ivan Goff – backing vocals, keyboards
- Maurice C. Hagans – congas
- A.K. Webster – electric guitar
- David B. Gussam – electric guitar
- Kent Wood – keyboards
- Nathaniel Lucas – percussion
