= Who Comes to Boogie =

Single by Little Benny & the Masters
- B-side: "Who Comes to Boogie (Radio Edit)"
- Released: 1984
- Genre: Go-go
- Length: 3:52 (7" Version); 7:37 (12" Version); 7:16 (12" Version (Club Mix))
- Label: Bluebird Records,
- Songwriter(s): Robert Freeman
- Producer(s): Shine

Little Benny & the Masters singles chronology
"Who Comes to Boogie" (1984)	"The King" (1988)

"Who Comes to Boogie" is a single by the Washington, D.C. Go-go group Little Benny & the Masters that was released in 1984. The single reached #33 in the UK Singles Chart in February 1985.

== Track listing ==
7" Single

1. "Who Comes to Boogie (Radio Edit)" (Robert Freeman) – 3:50
2. "Who Comes to Boogie" – 3:52

12" Single

1. "Who Comes to Boogie (Club Mix)" – 7:16
2. "Who Comes to Boogie" – 7:37
3. "Who Comes to Boogie" (Radio) – 3:50

== Charts ==
Chart (1985)	Peak position
UK (Official Charts Company)	33

== Personnel ==
- Benny Anthony Harley – lead vocals and trumpet
- Mark Lawston - keyboards
- Lowell Tucker - keyboards
- Tommy Crosby – guitars
- Rick Holmes - bass
- Rick Wellman - drums
- Tyron Williams - percussion
- Steve Colman, Vernon McDonald, Reggie Thomas – brass instruments
- Diane Borg, Kim Anderson – backing vocals
- Dana Mozie, – dj cutting and scratching
