= Made of Money =

Made of Money may refer to:

- "Made of Money", a song from Adam Ant's 1982 album Friend or Foe
- "Made of Money", a song from The Promise (T'Pau album), 1991
- "Made of Money", a song from !!!'s 2010 album Strange Weather, Isn't It?

== See also ==
- Making Money (disambiguation)
