= Cool "Disco" Dan =

American graffiti artist

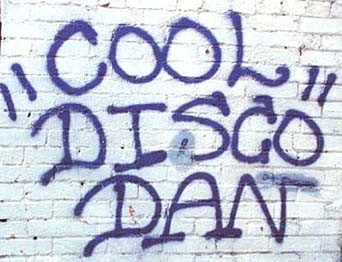
- Example of the Cool "Disco" Dan tag
- Born: Dan Hogg; December 31, 1969; Boston, Massachusetts
- Died: July 26, 2017 (aged 47)
- Occupation: Graffiti artist

Cool "Disco" Dan (December 31, 1969 – July 26, 2017) was the pseudonym of American graffiti artist Dan Hogg. His standard mark, a particularly styled rendering of his name, was ubiquitous in the Washington metropolitan area, notably along the route of the Washington Metro Red Line.

== Life and work ==
Dan was born in Boston, Massachusetts, in 1969. His mother and father moved the family to Annandale, Virginia, when Dan was a young boy. As a child, Dan was teased for being short; neighborhood children called him "Disco Danny," inspired by a character from the TV show What's Happening!!. Difficulties with socializing and a lifelong struggle with mental illness contributed to his isolation from Washington, D.C.'s drug scene and gang wars of the 1980s and '90s.

Cool "Disco" Dan began spraying his tag in 1984. Part of D.C.'s Go-Go scene of the 1980s, he managed to avoid being jailed or killed, unlike many of his contemporaries, by devoting himself to graffiti rather than involving his art with drugs or gangs. The pervasiveness of his mark was reported frequently in the local press.

He is featured in the book Free Agents, a history of Washington, DC graffiti, and has a page on "Art Crimes" as a featured artist.

His work was for several decades part of the landscape of Washington, as attested by mentions of him in George P. Pelecanos' novel Shame the Devil as a "D.C. legend" and in Dinaw Mengestu's novel The Beautiful Things That Heaven Bears and in lyrics by Giant Robot and experimental pop act Golden Birds. Works of his have been acquired and exhibited by the Corcoran Gallery of Art. His tag appears briefly in the 1996 motion picture Mars Attacks!. His graffiti can also be seen for a moment in The Frighteners.

The name was used as part of a Jeopardy!-style answer by The Washington Post in its weekly Style Invitational contest. The winning "question" for the answer "Moses, Jesus and Cool 'Disco' Dan" was "Who is Marion Barry going to need help from to clean up Washington?"

He is the subject of a 2013 documentary, The Legend of Cool "Disco" Dan.

Cool "Disco" Dan died on July 26, 2017, of complications of diabetes.
