= Buck Wild (song) =

Single by E.U.

from the album Livin' Large
- A-side: "Buck Wild"
- B-side: "Express"
- Released: 1989
- Genre: Go-go; New jack swing
- Length: 5:55
- Label: Virgin Records
- Songwriter(s): Kent Wood; William House
- Producer(s): Kent Wood; William House

E.U. singles chronology
"Da Butt" (1988)	"Buck Wild" (1989)	"Taste of Your Love" (1989)

"Buck Wild" is a 1989 single released by the Washington, D.C.–based go-go band Experience Unlimited. The song was released as the first single from their 1989 album Livin' Large. The single peaked at #7 on Billboard's "Hot R&B/Hip-Hop songs" chart, on May 13, 1989.

== Track listing ==
A-Side

1. "Buck Wild" (12" Mix) – 5:41
2. "Buck Wild" (B-Boy Mix) – 4:21

B-Side

1. "Buck Wild" (Dub) – 3:35
2. "Buck Wild" (Instrumental) – 4:02
3. "Express" – 4:19
