= Future Funk =

Live album by Experience Unlimited
- Released: 1982
- Genres: Go-go; old-school hip hop
- Length: 35:13
- Label: Galaxy Unlimited Records
- Producer: Robert "Shine" Freeman(exec)

Experience Unlimited chronology
Just the Way You Like It (1981)	Future Funk (1982)	2 Places at the Same Time (1986)

Professional ratings
Review scores
Source	Rating
The Rolling Stone Album Guide	2.5/5 stars

Future Funk is a live album released in 1982 by the Washington, D.C.–based go-go band Experience Unlimited.

== Critical reception ==
The Washington Informer wrote: "Side Two is given over to 'Crankin' At The Go Go'. This is the E.U. groove—nineteen minutes and eighteen seconds of it. Long form, tongue-in-cheek, big fun funk, its raison d'etre is that 'everybody got to do the do.' You know ... the 'do' ... the 'freaky deak' ... Anyway 'Crankin ...' is definitely for pumping up the dance floor."

== Track listing ==
Side A

1. "Wind It On Up" – 6:04
2. "Future Funk" – 6:38
3. "Tell Me Why" – 3:13

Side B

1. "Crankin' at the Go-Go" – 19:38

== Personnel ==
- Gregory "Sugar Bear" Elliott – lead vocals, bass guitar
- Ivan Goff – keyboards
- Kent Wood – keyboards
- Ricky “Sugarfoot” Wellman – drums
- Genairo "Foxxy" Brown Foxx – congas, percussions
- Timothy "Short Tim" Glover – percussions
- Valentino "Tino" Jackson – electric guitar
- Darryel "Tidy Boy" Hayes – trumpet
- Michal "Go Go Mike" Taylor – trombone
