= Cold Kickin' It =

Studio album by E.U.
- Released: October 23, 1990
- Genre: Go-go; hip hop; new jack swing
- Length: 46:04
- Label: Virgin Records
- Producer: Gregory Elliott; Ivan Goff; William "JuJu" House

E.U. chronology
Livin' Large (1989)	Cold Kickin' It (1990)	Make Money (1996)

Professional ratings
Review scores
Source	Rating
Allmusic	2/5 stars
ARTISTdirect	1.5/5 stars
Robert Christgau	(dud)

Cold Kickin' It is a studio album released in 1990 by the Washington, D.C.–based go-go band E.U. The album is a follow-up to their 1989 album Livin' Large.

== Track listing ==
No.	Title	Writer(s)	Length
1.	"I Confess"	Experience Unlimited	3:56
2.	"You Are"	Experience Unlimited	4:47
3.	"Keep It Up"	Experience Unlimited	5:29
4.	"Got to Be Wherever You Are"	Experience Unlimited	4:56
5.	"Money"	Janie Bradford; Berry Gordy	4:39
6.	"Ain't Found the Right One Yet"	Experience Unlimited	4:08
7.	"Longer Than Time"	Experience Unlimited	3:50
8.	"Let It Go"	Experience Unlimited	4:25
9.	"Funky Like a Monkey"	Experience Unlimited	4:55
10.	"Hot Cakes"	Experience Unlimited	4:59
Total length:			46:04

== Singles ==
Year	Title	Chart Positions
Year	Title	US R&B
1990	"I Confess"	27
1991	"Ain't Found the Right One Yet"	72
