= Maiesha Rashad =

American vocalist

Maiesha Rashad was an African American vocalist who is often referred to as the 'First Lady of Go-Go' music.

== Life and career ==
Maiesha Rashad was born Maiesha Collins in Indianapolis, Indiana. She studied classical singing in Indiana and later moved to Washington, DC in the 1970s where she studied film, television, and radio broadcast management at Howard University and American University. She graduated from Howard University in 1994.

Rashad was a vocalist who performed jazz, gospel, R&B, soul, and Go-Go music. She began singing at the age of 7 and writing at the age of 14. Her vocal ability was noted for its warmth and broad range. Rashad formed and led a number of bands. Her first band was a jazz group called the Maiesha Collins Rendezvous. Other bands included TopKat, the all-female jazz-fusion group Maiesha Rashad with Lavender Rain, and a 95-voice gospel choir for the Capitol Hill Seventh-day Adventist Church.

In 1996, she formed Maeisha and the Hiphuggers, which started as a soul band. Maeisha and the Hiphuggers began performing Go-Go music after welcoming William “JuJu” House and Gregory “Sugar Bear” Elliott of Go-Go band Experience Unlimited to the group. Prior to residing in Washington, DC, Rashad was not familiar with Go-Go music, the District's official regional music which blends funk, rhythm and blues, soul, and audience involvement through call and response. The band performed to packed houses at a number of Washington, DC-area venues, especially Northwest D.C.’s Takoma Station, Bailey's Café and Grill, and a Professional Ladies’ Night at Republic Gardens.

As Maeisha and the Hiphuggers' popularity grew, they welcomed additional members of Experience Unlimited and other local Go-Go bands to the group, such as "Sweet" Cherie Mitchell. They performed seven days a week and up to ten shows per week. The band is credited with ushering in what is often called the "Grown ‘n’ Sexy" era of Go-Go due to the older age of the crowds they attracted. Maiesha played 70s-inspired concerts that appealed to people over 30, wearing afro wigs, dashikis, and bellbottoms and performing covers of Chaka Khan and Rufus, the Jackson 5 and Earth, Wind & Fire. Some members of the Go-Go community, like trombone player Mike "Hard Step" Taylor, have criticized the impact the Grown & Sexy movement had on Go Go music, noting that popular covers of soul music with a pocket became preferred by promoters causing original Go-Go compositions to take a back seat. However, former manager of Experience Unlimited Charles Stephenson, bandmate and EU frontman Gregory “Sugar Bear” Elliot, and Howard University professor Natalie Hopkinson credit Maeisha and the Hiphuggers with reviving Go-Go in the late 1990s and early 2000s and making it more acceptable to club owners.

Rashad worked with manager Adrienne DreDre Burkley.

Rashad stepped away from The Hiphuggers in 1999 following spinal surgery. She officially left in 2001 and the band continued as Sugar Bear & the Hiphuggers.

In 2000-2001, Rashad formed the nine-piece soul and jazz orchestra called Chak Rah. The band's sound was a combination of '70s bands like Earth, Wind & Fire; jazz standards; singers like Phyllis Hyman, Sarah Vaughn and Chaka Khan; and a blend of funk, jazz and go-go. Performers included musical director and keyboard player Demi Doc, keyboard player Eli Staples, guitarist Tony Cothran, drummer Kiggo Wellman, bassist Elrod Lewis, conga players Larnell "Whitey" Carr and Alejandro Lucini and saxophonist Mike Wolff. As a member of Chak Rah, Rashad was determined to learn the guitar. Her stated motivation was to demonstrate the skill women have as musicians. To The Washington Post she noted, "I hate the stereotype attached to the 'chick singer. A lot of us 'chicks' are trying to change that, because we're tired of the band members saying, 'You don't have to play anything, you just sing and shake your [backside].' Come on, we can do more than that!"

== Death and legacy ==
Rashad was inducted into the Go-Go Hall of Fame in 2019 and is often referred to as the 'First Lady of Go-Go'.

She was diagnosed with stage 4 stomach cancer in February 2020 and succumbed to the disease on June 15 of the same year.

Rashad was married to Brian Rashad. The couple had one daughter, Raina Rashad, who is also a musician.
