= Charles C. Stephenson Jr. =

American petroleum industry executive

Charles C. Stephenson Jr. is a petroleum industry executive and philanthropist. He was born in Antlers, Oklahoma, the son of a successful grocer. He lives in Tulsa, Oklahoma.

== Education ==
Stephenson graduated from Antlers High School in 1955. He received his B.S. degree in Petroleum Engineering from the University of Oklahoma in 1959.

== Business accomplishments ==
After receiving his degree, Stephenson began his career with the Amerada Petroleum Company in 1960 and worked there until 1971. Stephenson then joined Andover Oil Company as vice-president of operations and became president of the company in 1974, serving until 1983 when he co-founded the Vintage Petroleum Company in Tulsa.

Stephenson served as president of Vintage from 1983 until 1990, when it became a public company. He is currently its chairman and CEO. Vintage has become known as one of the most aggressive and flourishing companies in exploration for new oil and natural gas reserves, acquiring producing properties from major oil companies and marketing the production both domestically and in South America.

Stephenson is also active on the boards of directors of several smaller concerns, including AAON (since 1996), Regent Private Capital LLC—which he co-founded; Growth Capital Partners—which he co-founded, and Premier Natural Resources—which he also co-founded. In addition he is president of Stephenson Investments, Inc.

== Contributions to society ==
Stephenson and his wife, Peggy, established the Charles and Peggy Stephenson Chair in Petroleum Engineering at the University of Oklahoma in 1994. He also participates in the university’s governance through his activities on the boards of visitors of the College of Engineering and the Mewbourne College of Earth and Energy.

The university engaged in a massive construction campaign during recent years, in which Stephenson has played a key role. He founded the Sarkeys Energy Center—a tower housing many of OU’s energy and geophysical research units—and funded the construction of two campus research facilities, the Stephenson Research and Technology Center and the Stephenson Life Sciences Research Center.

The University of Oklahoma Health Sciences Center in Oklahoma City has also been the beneficiary of Stephenson’s philanthropy. He has provided a significant gift to support its nationally known Dean McGee Eye Institute. In November 2010, Charles and Peggy Stephenson made a $12 million donation to The University of Oklahoma Health Sciences Center. In recognition of their support to the institution, a newly built cancer center has been named the Peggy and Charles Stephenson Oklahoma Cancer Center.

Stephenson serves on the boards of trustees for the University of Tulsa and the University of Oklahoma Foundation.

Antlers, Oklahoma—Stephenson’s hometown—and Pushmataha County of which it is the county seat were not, until 2015, beneficiaries of Stephenson’s philanthropic efforts. During that year the Stephenson Foundation donated $100,000 (approximately half the cost) for construction of a multipurpose sports complex for Antlers Public Schools. He has few or no remaining family ties there, and is not known to have any remaining interest or connections to the area.

== Honors and awards ==
The University of Oklahoma has awarded Stephenson an honorary doctorate. He was elected to the university’s Distinguished Graduates Society in 1996.

He was elected to the Tulsa Hall of Fame in 2000, and received the Tulsa Humanitarian Award in 2002. He was inducted into the Oklahoma Hall of Fame in 2008, and has been recognized by the I Believe in Oklahoma organization.
