= Cat in the Hat (Little Benny & the Masters album) =

Studio album by Little Benny & the Masters
- Released: 1987
- Genre: Go-go
- Length: 25:54
- Labels: Big City Records; Goff Records
- Producers: Anthony Harley; Ivan Goff; William "Ju Ju" House; Mark Lawson

Little Benny & the Masters chronology
Cat in the Hat (1987)	Gett Your Drink On (1997)

Cat in the Hat is the first studio album by the Washington D.C.–based go-go band Little Benny & the Masters, originally released on cassette and LP in 1987. The album was remastered and reissued in 1990 on CD. The album includes the band's most popular hits "Let Me Show You" (which samples The Jacksons song "Show You the Way to Go"), "The Message", and "Cat In the Hat".

== Track listing ==
No.	Title	Length
1.	"Let Me Show You"	0:44
2.	"Elmo Get Gusy"	1:30
3.	"The Message"	4:39
4.	"Hit and Run"	5:03
5.	"Ivan Goff Groove (Titled "Big City Groove" in original vinyl pressings)"	3:32
6.	"Cat in the Hat"	4:00
7.	"Do It Fluid"	3:40
8.	"Back It Up"	2:00
Total length:		24:54

== Personnel ==
- Anthony "Little Benny" Harley – lead vocals, trumpet
- William "Ju Ju" House – drums
- Elmo – congas, percussions
- Ivan Goff – keyboard
- Godfather Mark – keyboard
- Bolg – electric guitar
