= D.C. Scorpio =

American rapper

- Also known as: DC Scorpio
- Born: Lanard Thompson
- Origin: Washington, D.C. United States
- Genres: Hip-Hop; Go-Go
- Occupation: Rapper
- Years active: 1986–present
- Labels: Kolossal; I Hear Ya!

Lanard "D.C. Scorpio" Thompson (also credited as "DC Scorpio") is a Washington, D.C.–based hip-hop recording artist. He is best known for the singles "Stone Cold Hustler", "Beam Me Up, Scotty", and "Stone Cold Hustler II". D.C. Scorpio is considered to be a pioneer in the D.C. hip-hop scene, and is known for infusing go-go music and culture into his songs. He also starred in the 1998 independent film Streetwise.

== Discography ==
=== Singles ===
- "Stone Cold Hustler" – (Kolossal, 1987)
- "Beam Me Up, Scotty" – (I Hear Ya!, 1988)
- "Stone Cold Hustler II" – (Washington Hit Makers, 1990)
- "How You Like Your Rhymes to Be" – (Creative Funk, 1990)

=== Other related albums ===
- Go Go Live at the Capital Centre – (I Hear Ya!, 1987)
- The Go Go Posse – (I Hear Ya!, 1988)

== See also ==
- Hip hop in Washington, D.C.
