= The Word & Sardines =

Single by Junkyard Band
- A-side: "The Word"
- B-side: "Sardines"
- Released: 1986
- Genre: Go-go; old-school hip hop
- Length: 6:09 – "The Word"; 6:45 – "Sardines"
- Label: Def Jam
- Songwriter(s): Steve Harrison; R. Smith
- Producer(s): Rick Rubin

The Word & Sardines is the debut single recorded and released by the Washington, D.C.–based go-go group Junkyard Band.

== Track listing ==
A-side

1. "The Word" – 6:09
2. "The Word" (short version) – 3:31

B-side

1. "Sardines" – 6:45

== Samples ==
- Beastie Boys ("The Maestro (Live)")
- Cut Chemist ("King Kumoniwanaleia")
- Invisibl Skratch Piklz ("Invisbl Skratch Piklz vs. Da Klamz Uv Deth")
- Masters Of Ceremony ("Cracked Out")
- MC Zappa ("The Jam")
- Stetsasonic ("We're The Band")
- Timbaland ("Clock Strikes (Remix)")
