= Northeast Groovers =

American band

- Origin: Washington, D.C., U.S.
- Genres: Go-go; hip-hop
- Years active: 1985–present
- Label: Future Records
- Members: Chris "Rapper Dude" Black: Khari Pratt; Lamond "Maesto" Perkins; Ronald "88" Utley; Leonard "Daddy-O" Huggins; Ronald "Dig-Dug" Dixon; Larry "Stomp Dogg" Atwater (replaced Jammin Jeff Warren in 1996); Samuel "Smoke" Dews (former NEG conga player); David "32" Ellis; "Jammin" Jeff Warren (former NEG drummer)

Northeast Groovers (also referred to as NEG and as N.E.G.) is a Washington, D.C.–based go-go band formed in 1985. Northeast Groovers have been active in the Washington metropolitan area, producing numerous songs in the Washington music scene and several hits nationwide, including the singles "The Water", "Van Damme" and "Booty Call".

== History ==
=== Beginnings ===
Northeast Groovers was formed in 1985 in Northeast, Washington, D.C., consisting of nine members: bass player Khari Pratt, keyboardist Lamond "Maestro" Perkins, keyboardist Ronald "88" Utley, Leonard "Daddy-O" Huggins, Ronald "Dig-Dug" Dixon, Larry "Stomp Dogg" Atwater, Samuel "Smoke" Dews playing congas, and drummer "Jammin" Jeff Warren. The group began playing Top 40 and hip-hop songs infused with go-go-rhythms at bowling alleys and nightclubs throughout the Washington metropolitan area (including the Ibex, Breeze's Metro Club, and the Celebrity Hall), and at music venues nationally.

N.E.G. released their debut single "Van Damme" in September 1993. "The Water" (which samples Aqua Boogie by Parliament) and "Twenty Minute Workout" were follow-up singles released in the same year. All three singles were included in the group's 1994 debut album Straight from the Basement. N.E.G. released the album N.E.G Jams in 1995, which received positive reviews from Billboard Magazine and The Washington Post. In 1996, N.E.G. released the single "Goosebumps!" which became a hit within the D.C. music scene. The follow-up albums Northeast Coming and Northeast on Fire were released in 1999.

=== Present formation ===
N.E.G. released the single "Dukes Up" in 2014, and is pioneering a new era in go-go music hoping to move the genre in a direction where it will take its rightful place in the realm of music. D.C.-based hip-hop artists such as Wale and Tabi Bonney have sampled songs by N.E.G., including Wale's for his 2006 song "Dig Dug (Shake It)" which sampled "Off Da Muscle". N.E.G. also provides social awareness for AIDS and inner city violence in the Washington metropolitan region.

== Discography ==
=== Albums ===
- Straight from the Basement, (Future Records & Tapes, 1994)
- N.E.G. Jams, (Future Records & Tapes, 1995)
- Northeast Coming, (Listen Up Records & Tapes, 1999)
- Northeast on Fire, (A Future Sound Production, 1999)

=== Singles ===
- "The Water" (1993)
- "Van Damme" (1993)
- "The Twenty Minute Workout" (1993)
- "24-7-365" (1994)
- "Booty Call" (1994)
- "Goosebumps" (1996)
- "Dukes Up" (2014)
