= Anthony Harley =

Benny Anthony Harley
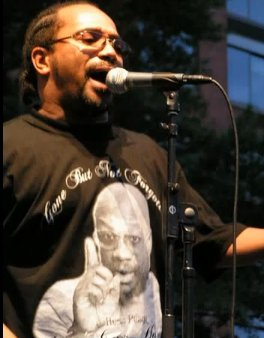

Background information
- Also known as: Little Benny
- Born: Benny Anthony Harley; September 26, 1963; Washington, D.C.
- Died: May 30, 2010 (aged 46) Washington, D.C.
- Genre: Go-go
- Occupations: Musician, songwriter, vocalist
- Instrument: Trumpet
- Formerly of: Rare Essence; Little Benny & the Masters

Benny Anthony Harley (September 26, 1963 – May 30, 2010), better known by his stage name Little Benny, was an American trumpet player who was a part of the Washington, D.C.-based go-go band Rare Essence. He has been called one of the founding fathers of the genre.

== Early life ==
Benny Anthony Harley was born on September 26, 1963, in Washington, D.C. His father Frank Harley sang in a band called "Bell Chorda". He grew up playing the electric guitar, but soon grew enamored by the trumpet. As Little Benny once said, "I saw this guy playing a horn in the parking lot and told him, let me see that thing. How do you play this?"

== Go-go music scene ==
Harley was a senior at Ballou Senior High School in Southeast, when go-go music emerged on the scene. Washington, D.C. based funk and go-go artist Chuck Brown is considered the founder of the genre, which included incessant beats and the use of conga drums, cow bells and call-and-response chants. Go-go gained widespread attention in the late-70s with the song "Bustin' Loose". After Brown went on tour, other bands popped up in and around the Washington metropolitan area. Harley joined Rare Essence in 1974, who were originally called The Young Dynamos. Harley's band, Rare Essence, was one of the most notable go-go bands and is considered to be an influential force in the genre. "When you look at go-go from a historical standpoint, Little Benny, he stands out as one of the founding fathers. Chuck Brown laid the foundation, but Rare Essence — and Benny was part of it during that time — built the house," said Kevin Kato Hammond. Little Benny & the Masters had one go-go hit "Who Comes to Boogie" in 1984, studio albums Cat in the Hat in 1987 and Gett Your Drink On in 1997, and live album Live at the Cafe in 2000. Harley was known for his energetic stage presence, his powerful voice, and the ability to play two trumpets at once.

== Later career and death ==
Harley left Rare Essence in the mid-80s to form another group called Little Benny & the Masters. He later played with the go-go band Proper Utensils and had several reunions with original members of Rare Essence. Later in life, he played often with Chuck Brown, including a show in Washington the night before his death. He died on May 30, 2010, at his brother's home in Washington, D.C.
