= Go Ju Ju Go =

Live album by E.U.
- Released: 1987
- Genre: Go-go; old-school hip hop
- Length: 24:45
- Label: Big City; Unlimited
- Producer: William House(exec); Ivan Goff (exec)

E.U. chronology
2 Places at the Same Time (1986)	Go Ju Ju Go (1987)	Rock Yuh Butt (1988)

Professional ratings
Review scores
Source	Rating
AllMusic	3/5 stars
Robert Christgau	B
The Rolling Stone Album Guide	3/5 stars

Go Ju Ju Go is a live album by the Washington, D.C.-based go-go band E.U., released in 1987.

== Track listing ==
Side A

1. "Go Ju Ju Go" – 4:45
2. "Shake It Like a White Girl" – 2:30
3. "Alright Oh No" – 2:30

Side B

1. "Bear's Melody (I Got a Little Song)" – 6:30
2. "Go Go Trail" – 4:30
3. "Pump It Up" – 2:00
4. "Hey Hey Hey" – 2:00

== Personnel ==
- Gregory "Sugar Bear" Elliott – lead vocals, bass guitar
- Ivan Goff – keyboards
- Kent Wood – keyboards
- William "Ju Ju" House – drums
- Genairo "Foxxy" Brown Foxx – congas, percussions
- Timothy "Short Tim" Glover – percussions
- Valentino "Tino" Jackson – electric guitar
- Darryel "Tidy Boy" Hayes – trumpet
- Michal "Go Go Mike" Taylor – trombone
