= DMV hip-hop =

Music in Washington, D.C.

- Stylistic origins: Go-go; hip-hop; East Coast hip-hop; Southern hip-hop
- Cultural origins: Mid 1980s, Washington metropolitan area

Regional scenes
- Modern Go-Go

DMV hip-hop is a blanket term for a regional genre of American hip-hop music that emerged in the Washington metropolitan area, which comprises Washington, D.C., Maryland, and Virginia.

Other prominent D.C. stations include WPGC 95.5 and WKYS 93.9, both of which are. The city's traditional style has been described as not quite the same as New York City hip-hop nor Southern hip-hop. Rather, it has been influenced by both regions to form its own unique style. The population of D.C. is not large enough to support as many distinct subgenres of rap as other metropolitan areas, and as a result, the sound and style of D.C. hip-hop is very mixed.

== Scene ==
Prominent D.C.-based hip-hop artists include producers Oddisee, Kev Brown, Damu the Fudgemunk, BlakeNine. Emcees Wale, XO, yU, Fat Trel, Head Roc, Watusi, Lightshow, Ant Glizzy, Ron Stackz, Pharaoh Jonez and Santino Ranks of YNWV. Nationally recognized newcomers include GoldLink, Chaz French, and IDK, and Shy Glizzy. Groups like Team Demolition, the Beat Konductaz and Panacea have also made great strides for Washington, D.C., hip-hop. Local radio stations 93.9 WKYS and 95.5 WPGC sometimes feature up and comers from the area.

20bello, a rapper, director, and promoter, was the original founder of the DMV (D for the District of Columbia, M for Maryland, and V for Northern Virginia, which together create the DC Metro area) music movement. He remains influential in the scene.

Hip-hop has been greatly overshadowed by go-go music, a post-funk type of music that is only relevant in the District of Columbia. Go-go music was created in the D.C. area and remains a very significant aspect of the culture of the city and surrounding areas. It emphasizes large percussion sections, and incorporates call and response and shout-outs into its songs. This results in a crowd that is very active and involved with the music, responding by dancing and echoing the words. Chuck Brown is known as the "godfather of go-go".
