= Da Butt =

1988 single by EU

Single by E.U.

from the album School Daze: Original Soundtrack Album
- Released: 1988
- Recorded: 1987
- Genre: Funk, go-go
- Length: 5:09 (extended version); 3:54 (single version)
- Label: EMI America
- Songwriter(s): Marcus Miller; Mark Stevens
- Producer(s): Marcus Miller

E.U. singles chronology
"Da Butt" (1988)	"Buck Wild" (1989)

"Da Butt" is a single released in 1988 from the original soundtrack to the film School Daze. The song was written by Marcus Miller and performed by the D.C.-based go-go band E.U. The song reached number one on the Billboard's Hot Black Singles chart for the week of April 23, 1988, and was ranked #61 on VH1's 100 Greatest One Hit Wonders of the 80s. The music video was directed by Spike Lee.

During the 93rd Academy Awards, actress Glenn Close danced to the song. In response, Gregory "Sugar Bear" Elliot of E.U. reacted by stating it was like winning a lottery ticket.

== Track listing ==
- 12" single
1. "Da Butt" (radio mix) – 6:20
2. "Da Butt" (B'Boy dub) – 5:23
3. "Da Butt" (extended version) – 5:09
4. "Da Butt" (7" version) – 3:54
- 7" single
1. "Da Butt" (7" version) – 3:54
2. "Da Butt" (B'Boy dub) – 5:23

== Chart performance ==
Chart (1988)	Peak position
New Zealand (Recorded Music NZ)	50
UK Singles (OCC)	87
US Billboard Hot 100	35
US Dance Club Songs (Billboard)	23
US Hot Black Singles (Billboard)	1
