= Junk Yard Band =

Go-go band from Washington, D.C., United States

- Origin: Washington, D.C., USA
- Genres: Go-go
- Years active: 1980–present
- Labels: Def Jam; Street
- Members: Buggs, Gene Pratt, KC, Mo Shorter, Wink-O, Daniel Baker, Demi-Doc, T-Bob, Dre Dog, Bruce Bailey, Dave Ellis aka 32, Plucky, Mike Strong, Jasper, Blue Eye Darryl, Peetey, Black Pooh, Jason Lane
- Past members: Heavy One, Shorty Pop, Lil Derrick

The Junk Yard Band is a Washington, D.C–based go-go band, founded in the early 1980s by children playing on improvised instruments. They are best known for their songs- "Sardines" and "The Word."

== Biography ==
The band was formed in 1980 by children, ranging in age from 8 to 13, living in the Barry Farm government housing project in Washington, D.C. They were inspired to play after witnessing the performances of local go-go bands in their neighborhood. Not having resources to purchase traditional instruments, the children instead scoured their neighborhood in search of objects that could emulate the sound of real instruments: hubcaps, plastic buckets, crates, cans, and discarded pots and pans - these types of GoGo bands became known as "Bucket Bands". After a few informal performances in Barry Farm, the group was dubbed the "Junk Yard Band" by locals. This is perhaps a reference to the animated television program, Fat Albert and the Cosby Kids, whose band "The Junk Yard Gang" also performed on improvised instruments.

With go-go music gaining in popularity, and the band gaining local notoriety, the band began booking performances at schools, recreation centers, fundraisers, and government agencies. The band was often seen performing for tourists on the streets of Washington, D.C. This popularity led to appearances in a 1984 Cavalier Men's Store television advertisement, the 1983 film D.C. Cab and the 1988 film Tougher Than Leather with Run-D.M.C.. It was this interaction with Run-D.M.C.'s Run that led to an eventual contract with older brother Russell Simmons' Def Jam Recordings.

Far from being a novelty act, "Junk Yard" can be thought of as the creators of the "new school" in terms of their contribution to the world of go-go. Before them, every go-go band of any significance had a horn section, bass guitar player, and most likely a lead guitar player also. Early Junk Yard had none of these but instead developed a characteristic layered percussion sound based on improvised instruments.

However, by 1986, the only contributing improvised instruments were plastic buckets and other things in replication of the standard go-go three roto-tom/two timbales configuration. That year, the band scored their first major hit, and arguably their signature song, "Sardines," which earned them airplay outside of the D.C. market.

In 1992, original member and drummer "Heavy One" was gunned down in the same Barry Farms projects where the band perfected their bucket band style.

== Recording career ==
Def Jam released the band's song "Sardines" as a single in 1986. The song received considerable airplay, and the band embarked on a tour of the United States as an opening act for acts such as Guy, Salt-n-Pepa, Tupac Shakur, and labelmates Beastie Boys and Slayer. No longer viewed simply as a novelty act, the group performed at such prestigious venues as the Kennedy Center and the Apollo Theater.

The group signed with Street Records, in 1992.

== Discography ==
=== Albums ===
Title	Format	Label	Year
The Word / Sardines	LP	Def Jam	1986
Live at Safari Club	LP	Street Records	1989
Don't Sleep on Us	LP	Street Records	1991
Creepin' Thru Da Hoodz	LP	Street Records	1994
Reunion 95	LP	Street Records	1996
Go Hard	LP	Street Records	1996
The Beginning/The End	LP	Liaison	1999

=== Singles and EPs ===
Title	Format	Label	Year
Jigglin' Baby	12" EP	Street Records	
The Word/Sardines	12" EP	Def Jam	1986
The Word/Sardines	7" single	Def Jam	1986
Ruff It Off	12" EP	Street Records	1992
Loose Booty/Let It Ride (Socket Beat)	12" EP	Street Records	1994
The Rippa Medley/Ha Ha, Yuck Yuck Yuck Yah	12" EP	Street Records	1995
Here Come The Freaks/Uh Oh	12" EP	Street Records	1996
JY On The Rise (Wink & Dog)/Redrum	12" EP	Street Records	1996
Tiddy Balls	12" EP	Street Records	1996

Many bootleg tapes and cds of the band's live shows are in circulation. Although recordings exist from throughout the band's existence, recordings from the band's prime era (1987–1997) are the most sought after.
