= Experience Unlimited =

American go-go/funk band

- Origin: Washington, D.C., U.S.
- Genres: Go-go; R&B; funk
- Years active: 1975–1997
- Labels: EMI America; Virgin
- Members: Gregory "Sugar Bear" Elliot; Edward "Junie" Henderson; William "Ju-Ju" House; Maurice "Mighty Moe" Hagans; A.K. Webster; Jeno “Keys” Meyer
- Past members: Kent Wood (deceased); Ivan Goff (deceased); Clarence"Oz"Arvil Smith (deceased); Go-Go Bouncey Nathaniel Marshall Lucas Sr; Steven "Too Tall Steve" Coleman

Experience Unlimited (also known as simply E.U.) is a Washington, D.C.–based go-go/funk band that enjoyed its height of popularity in the 1980s and early 1990s. Fronted by lead singer/bassist Gregory "Sugar Bear" Elliot, the group has had a fluctuating membership over the years, but they have maintained a fairly loyal following.

== History ==
The band's biggest hit was 1988's "Da Butt," which appeared on the soundtrack for the Spike Lee film School Daze. The song charted at number 35 on the Billboard Hot 100. Following the Spike Lee soundtrack success the band signed a deal with Virgin Records and scored two additional Top Billboard Hits. The first hit was "Buck Wild" which was co-written and co-produced by William "Ju Ju" House and the late Kent Wood. "Buck Wild" peaked at No. 7 on the R&B/Hip Hop Charts. The second Top Billboard hit following the group's No. 1 R&B hit "Da Butt" was released on February 2, 1988.

"Taste of Your Love," sung by E.U.'s lead singer, Edward "Junie" Henderson, was the band's last Billboard top-ten hit. It was co-written (along with Harold "Chucky" Lloyd) and produced by Marvin Ennis. Ennis also played all of the instruments and did all of the background vocals on the track contrary to what the credits on the Livin' Large album reflect. The song "Da Butt" and the actual band which included Gregory "Sugar Bear" Elliott, William House, Ivan Goff, Kent Wood, Valentino Jackson, Edward Henderson, Mike Taylor, Darryl Hayes, and J. Foxx, were featured in Spike Lee's film School Daze." The song was written by Marcus Miller and performed by E.U. The song reached number one on the Billboard's Hot Black Singles chart[1] for the week of April 23, 1988, and was ranked No. 61 on VH1's 100 Greatest One Hit Wonders of the 80s. The music video was directed by Spike Lee.

E.U. experienced a resurgence in the mid to late 1990s, by partnering with the jazz, gospel, pop and gospel session singer, Maiesha Rashad, while performing under the name Maiesha and The Hip Huggers featuring E.U. Maiesha and The Hip Huggers have headlined events and concert venues such as B.B. King's Blues Club and Grill, DAR Constitution Hall, Black Family Reunion and D.C.'s Stone Soul Picnic and Unifest.

In 2012, "Da Butt" was licensed for an Xbox 360 game Dance Central 3.

In 2019, E.U. have reunited to perform Da Butt at the 2019 BET Awards.

In 2023 “Hey You”, from their 1977 debut album was featured in New Balance advertisements.

== Legacy/samples ==
E.U.'s music has been sampled extensively by other artists, across multiple genres. Alternative rocker Beck sampled E.U.'s "Knock Him Out Sugar Ray" just before the second verse in his hit "Where It's At". According to the database WhoSampled, this particular song has also been sampled by high profile hip-hop artists such as N.W.A and Public Enemy. Public Enemy also sampled "E.U. Freeze" on their single "Night of the Living Baseheads".

== Discography ==
=== Studio albums ===
- Free Yourself (1977)
- Rock Yuh Butt (1988)
- Livin' Large (1989) U.S. No. 158, U.S. R&B No. 22
- Cold Kickin' It (1990) U.S. R&B No. 92
- Make Money (1996)
- School Daze Revisited (2008)

=== Live albums ===
- Future Funk (1982) Unifest
- 2 Places at the Same Time (1986)
- Go Ju Ju Go (1987)

=== Singles ===
| Year | Title | Chart Positions | | | |
| Year | Title | US Pop | US Dance Maxi-Singles | US Dance | US R&B |
|---|---|---|---|---|---|
| 1988 | "Da Butt" | 35 | 4 | 23 | 1 |
| 1989 | "Buck Wild" | - | 47 | - | 7 |
| 1989 | "Livin' Large" | - | - | - | 63 |
| 1989 | "Taste of Your Love" | 88 | - | - | 4 |
| 1990 | "I Confess" | - | - | - | 27 |
| 1991 | "Ain't Found the Right One Yet" | - | - | - | 72 |
