= Go-go =

Subgenre of funk music

- Stylistic origins: Funk; Latin music; R&B; soul music
- Cultural origins: Mid 1960s – late 1970s; Washington, D.C., United States

Regional scenes
- Washington metropolitan area; Mid-Atlantic region

Other topics
- Music of Washington, D.C.; list of funk musicians

Go-go is a subgenre of funk music with an emphasis on specific rhythmic patterns, and live audience call and response.

Go-go was originated by African-American musicians in Washington, D.C., during the mid-1960s to late-1970s. Go-go has limited popularity in other areas, but maintains a devoted audience in the Washington metropolitan area as a uniquely regional music style and was named the official music of Washington, D.C., in February 2020.

Performers associated with the development of the style include Rare Essence, E.U., Trouble Funk, and singer-guitarist Chuck Brown. Modern artists like Charles "Shorty Corleone" Garris continue the go-go tradition in D.C.

== Description ==
basic go-go beat
The most important part of the go-go beat is the bass/snare pattern.

In technical terms, "go-go's essential beat is characterized by a five through four syncopated rhythm that is underscored prominently by the bass drum and snare drum, and the hi-hat... [and] is ornamented by the other percussion instruments, especially by the conga drums, rototoms, and hand-held cowbells."

Unique to go-go is instrumentation with two standard congas and two junior congas, 8" and 9" wide and about half as tall as the standard congas, a size rare outside go-go. They were introduced to Rare Essence by Tyrone "Jungle Boogie" Williams in the early days when they couldn't afford full-sized congas and are ubiquitous ever since. Its name arises from the persistent percussive beat, but it incorporates elements of many other genres.

== Origins ==
Although Chuck Brown is known as "the Godfather of Go-Go", go-go is a musical movement that cannot be traced back to one single person, as there were so many bands that flourished during the beginning of this era that they collectively created the sound that is recognized as go-go of today. Artists such as Marvin Gaye, Van McCoy, Billy Stewart, Peaches & Herb, Black Heat, Experience Unlimited (E.U.), Vernon Burch, Sir Joe Quarterman & the Free Soul, the Moments, Ray, Goodman & Brown, True Reflection, the Unifics, Terry Huff & Special Delivery, Act 1, the Dynamic Superiors, Skip Mahoney & the Casuals, the Choice Four, and the Fuzz that played soul music during pre-go-go era.

The term "gogo" (as it applies to a music venue) originated in France in the early 1960s, at the Whiskyagogo nightclub, named after the French title for the British comedy "Whisky Galore!". The club also featured go-go dancers. In January 1964, capitalizing on the emerging popularity of "go-go dancers", the name was licensed to a Los Angeles club, the Whisky a Go Go, and from there the term "go-go" spread nationwide. The Cafe Au Go Go in NYC was also in business during that time, gaining notoriety when Lenny Bruce was arrested there in April 1964. By 1965, "go-go" was a recognized word for a music club, as evidenced by the TV show Hollywood A Go-Go (march 1965-1966), or the song title of that year's hit Going to a Go-Go by Smokey Robinson & the Miracles (released November 1965). At a go-go club, dancers could expect to hear the latest top 40 hits, performed by local bands and DJ's. (The French Whiskyagogo had been one of the first venues in the world to replace live music with records selected by a disc jockey.)

In Washington D.C., the Young Senators were formed in 1965, beginning a fierce competition with Chuck Brown and Black Heat on the local club circuit. The Young Senators later became known for their song "Jungle" released in 1970 by Innovation Records.

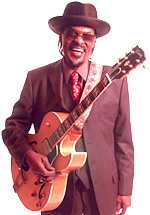
Guitarist and bandleader Chuck Brown is widely regarded as "the Godfather of Go-Go".

Chuck Brown was a fixture on Washington and Maryland music scene with his band Los Lotinos as far back as 1966. By the mid-1970s, he had changed the group's name to The Soul Searchers, and developed a laid-back, rhythm-heavy style of funk performed with one song blending into the next (in order to keep people on the dance floor). The beat was based on Grover Washington Jr.'s song "Mr. Magic," though Brown has said in interviews that both he and Washington had adapted the beat from a gospel music beat found in black churches.

Washington, D.C., funk's early national chart action came when Black Heat (the first D.C. go-go band to be signed by a major record label) released their Billboard top 100 hit "No Time To Burn" from their second album on Atlantic Records in 1974. They then toured with such national acts as Earth, Wind & Fire, Parliament-Funkadelic, Ohio Players, The Commodores, and others. In 1976, James Funk, a young DJ who spun at clubs in between Soul Searchers sets, was inspired (and encouraged by Brown himself) to start a band—called Rare Essence (originally the Young Dynamos)—that played the same kind of music.

== History ==
Chuck Brown and the Soul Searchers released their first go-go hit "Bustin' Loose" in late 1978; it reached number one on the Billboard Hot R&B/Hip-Hop Songs R&B charts and held that position for a month during February and March 1979 (peaking at #34 on the Pop chart).

Experience Unlimited (a.k.a. E.U.) who originally formed in 1974 was a band more influenced by rock (their name a nod to the Jimi Hendrix Experience), that started out in the 1970s. After witnessing Rare Essence in the late-1970s, they modified their style to incorporate the go-go beat. Kurtis Blow's "Party Time" subsequently put them on the map to be later tracked down by Grace Jones and to take the King of Go-Go Production, Maxx Kidd to an international music adventure with Island Records, to make E.U.'s greatest hit "Da Butt" for the soundtrack of the 1988 film School Daze, written, directed and produced by Spike Lee.

Trouble Funk had its roots in the early 1970s Top 40 cover band called Trouble Band, then fronted by drummer, Emmett Nixon. With the inclusion of Robert 'Dyke' Reed (keyboards, guitar, vocals), Taylor Reed (trumpet, vocals), James Avery (keyboards, vocals), Teebone David (percussion), and Tony Fisher (bass, vocals), the band changed its name, and, in the late 1970s, after seeing the light at a gig they played with Chuck Brown, they, too, adopted the go-go beat. The band was signed to the Sugar Hill Records label in 1982 and recorded with Kurtis Blow. Trouble Funk recorded the go-go anthem "Hey, Fellas."

=== 1980s ===
In the 1980s, some go-go bands such as Chuck Brown, Trouble Funk, EU, Rare Essence, Hot Cold Sweat, The Junk Yard Band, AM/FM, Redds and the Boys, Slug-Go achieved local success. Trouble Funk put out a few records on New Jersey–based label Jamtu before signing with one of the more powerful hip-hop labels, Sugar Hill, where it released a six-track LP called Drop the Bomb in 1982, which included the hit "Pump Me Up" which had already been a regional hit years before. Maxx Kidd founded go-go label T.T.E.D. Records in 1982.

In 1984, Island Records founder Chris Blackwell heard Chuck Brown's "We Need Some Money" on the radio in New York, which ultimately led to him signing some of the brightest stars of the go-go scene. Trouble Funk and E.U. were both signed to Island, while Chuck Brown, Redds and the Boys and Hot, Cold, Sweat were signed through a distribution deal between Max Kidd's T.T.E.D. and Island subsidiary 4th & B'way.

Along with the recording contracts Blackwell was handing out, he also wanted to make the go-go film and soundtrack; a D.C.-based version of The Harder They Come. The resultant film, Good to Go (or Short Fuse, as it was called on video) was plagued with problems: co-director Don Letts was let go halfway through production, the film became less about the music and more about drugs and violence, and despite the fact that most of the post-production was completed in the fall of 1985, the film was held for release until late-summer 1986. When it did poorly on release, it seemed that go-go had missed its best chance to break into the mainstream. "Good to Go" OST album was released in 1986 also. Soul/Funk groups used go-go beat in their songs. Examples of R&B were Club Nouveau "Lean on Me"(pop No. 1, yearend No. 10) Lebert "Casanova", and Midnight Star "Headlines".

The Junk Yard Band started out in 1980 as a group of kids (as young as nine) from the Barry Farm, Washington, D.C., projects. Unable to afford instruments for their band, they fashioned drums out of empty buckets and traffic cones, tin cans substituted for timbales, and, in place of a brass section, they used plastic toy horns. Adding real instruments to their gear a little at a time, by 1985 they had joined the ranks of D.C.'s finest; they were scooped up by Def Jam, who released a Rick Rubin-produced single "The Word" in 1986. Not much happened with that record—at first. However, within a year or two of its release, the flipside, "Sardines", became (and remains to this day) the group's signature song. It was even performed in the 1988 film Tougher Than Leather.

Rare Essence signed with Mercury/PolyGram Records but for one single for the label—"Flipside," released in 1986—was unremarkable.

E.U. got its big break in 1986 when it was booked to play a party celebrating the release of Spike Lee's debut film, She's Gotta Have It. Lee liked what he heard, and tapped the band to perform a song in his next movie, School Daze. "Da Butt" (written for the film by Marcus Miller and E.U. keyboardist, Kent Wood) made it to number one on Billboard's R&B chart (No. 35 Pop) and scored the band a Grammy nomination (they lost to "Love Overboard" by Gladys Knight & the Pips). Hoping to build on their success, in 1989 they released Livin' Large on Virgin Records. Two singles from the album ("Buck Wild" and "Taste of Your Love") made respectable showings on Billboard's R&B/Hip-Hop singles chart but they failed to repeat the success of "Da Butt." (The album peaked at No. 22 on the R&B/Hip-Hop chart and No. 158 on the Top 200.) A second Virgin release, Cold Kickin' It, came out the following year but failed to make much of an impression on the national charts. Experience Unlimited had a resurgence in the mid-1990s by partnering with the jazz and gospel singer Maiesha Rashad, performing under the name "Maiesha and the Hip Huggers". Maiesha and the Hip Huggers have headlined events and concert venues such as B.B. King's Blues Club and Grill, DAR Constitution Hall, Black Family Reunion and D.C.'s Stone Soul Picnic and Unifest. In 1988, R&B singer Jesse James and Fay Marshall released soul singles(T.T.E.D. Records).

=== 1990s–2000s ===
As time passed, more and more of a hip-hop influence crept into go-go. Early MCs like D.C. Scorpio gave way to DJ Kool, whose 1996 indie release "Let Me Clear My Throat"—based on a sample from DJ Mark the 45 King's "The 900 Number"—was picked up by American Recordings and in 1997 became go-go's last certifiable hit single (No. 4 on Billboard's Rap singles chart, No. 21 on the R&B/Hip-Hop singles chart, and No. 30 on the Hot 100). As the hip-hop content in go-go increased, the complexity of the musical arrangements decreased. Where bands once featured horn sections and multiple guitarists in addition to a phalanx of percussionists, many current go-go bands have stripped down to just keyboards and percussion. Another trend is to have a dedicated percussionist with plastic "wood blocks" performing much of what used to be handled by the junior congas.

There was, however, a retro movement in the 2000s reverting to go-go's original style of marathon sessions covering popular R&B songs such as Northeast Groovers. Many of these bands used the term "Grown 'n Sexy" to indicate a focus on appealing to audiences over 25. In 2006 and again in 2007, there was a Grown and Sexy Category at the WKYS 93.9 Go-Go Awards ceremony held at DAR Constitution Hall, which the Familiar Faces won in 2006, and L!ssen Da Grew^p won in 2007.

Some go-go artists have been able to transition into other areas of entertainment. Anwan "Big G" Glover—a founding member of the Backyard Band—became an actor, playing Slim Charles on HBO's The Wire. D.C. band Mambo Sauce also had hits with "Miracles" and "Welcome to D.C." which both cracked the Billboard charts. "Welcome to D.C." also became the official intro song for all of the Washington Wizards & Mystics home games and the video for the song was in rotation on VH1 Soul and BETJ and received airplay on MTVJams, MTV2, MTVU and BET. Kevin Kato Hammond, former lead guitarist for Little Benny & the Masters and former rapper for the band Proper Utensils, started the online magazine Take Me Out to the Go-Go in 1996. In addition to the magazine being a source of information on go-go shows, it serves as a community forum. During this time the emergence of Gogo combined with Pop was brewing. A producer by the name of Rich Harrison had begun incorporating traditional gogo elements into his production and landed 3 huge major label placements with Jennifer Lopez - Get Right, Amerie - 1 Thing, and Beyoncé - Crazy in Love. The latter 2 were huge for the sound but they weren’t associated with gogo as closely as the bands. The Rapper Wale (rapper) also used gogo in his sound and was signed to Interscope with Mark Ronson and later MMG with Rick Ross. He used his platform to expand gogo to a mainstream audience with features ( Pretty Girls (Wale song) ft Backyard Band, Bait ft TCB) and also live performances (UCB performing as his backing band at the MTV VMAs).

Additionally, musicians from other genres of music have incorporated elements of the go-go aesthetic into their compositions and stage acts. Jazz/rock musician Mike Dillon, leads a band called Go-Go Jungle, often playing long, non-stop sets that incorporate go-go beats and raps interspersed with other subgenres of funk, jazz, and rock. Another example is Bob Mintzer's composition "Go-Go" from the Yellowjackets' 2003 release, Time Squared. Composer Liza Figueroa Kravinsky composed the Go-Go Symphony, an original full orchestra symphony that incorporates the go-go and bounce beats. She founded the identically named Go-Go Symphony ensemble, which performs the Go-Go Symphony and other mashups of go-go and classical, sometimes in partnership with other full symphony orchestras. The February 21, 2014, world premiere of the fully orchestrated Go-Go Symphony and similar pieces, performed with the Capital City Symphony, received standing ovations and rave reviews.

Gogo had also began evolving with the times. The creation of a new rhythmic pattern emerged from the Total Control Band aka TCB. Led by Polo, they coined this new style of gogo by calling it the Bounce Beat. This style uses the timbales and more syncopated bouncy rhythms instead of the traditional congos and “swing” that gogo was known for. The Bounce beat reigned supreme with the younger fans of gogo from 2003 to present day.

Eventually the Bounce Beat started to slow down in tempo and some bands would create even slower vamps in songs called Slow Bounces. All of these new rhythmic ideas inspired dances to accompany them. The faster bounce beat was paired with a style called Beat Ya Feet while the slower would be paired with Chopping, and/or Clapping as a common practice by women. This era of gogo is infamous and very niche so the popular bands aren’t spoken about in traditional gogo conversations. A few names of these bands are TCB, CCB, UCB, TOB, Reaction, New Impressionz, ABM, XIB, AAO, Renegade, N2L, Gameova and UEB.

=== 2010s ===
In the late 2000s and early 2010s, it became harder for go-go bands and local venues to hold concerts as law enforcement in both Washington, D.C., and neighboring Prince George's County in Maryland viewed the concerts and bands as inciters of violence. New go-go music is still being produced, but remains local to the area, depending on live shows to share its full effects. There was 1 case however, where a band reached a mainstream level of success at this time. The band Rdgldgrn fused Indie Rock and GoGo together garnering the attention of a major label and getting signed around this time. Their first album featured production from Pharrell Williams and Guest Drumming from Dave Grohl. They toured the world and used the gogo sound in a new way that began to open the door for other bands to bring it to a mainstream rock audience.

Otherwise, most of the venues have closed, with some residents putting it down to gentrification which has forced many African-American residents out of previously low-income neighborhoods. One area, Shaw, which was 11 percent white in 1970, was 62 percent white by 2015. Some new residents, however, have embraced go-go and locals are optimistic that it will continue to thrive. After one new resident's complaint about noise in the street, there were protests, which grew into a block party with go-go performances.

=== 2020s ===
In February 2020, go-go was named the "official music" of Washington, D.C., in a unanimous vote by the D.C. Council following the #DontMuteDC movement. Go-go historians and local activists have advocated for city investment in go-go tourism as a result of financial challenges due to the COVID-19 pandemic. "In Washington, D.C., the Black Lives Matter protests over the summer of 2020 often included go-go bands performing on truck beds to thousands of onlookers as a highly visible and aural political symbol that could only happen in the capital of the United States." On August 22, 2021, it was announced that the DC Public Library's Go-Go Archive had acquired the photography catalog of 1,956 photographic images shot by photographer Chip Py who spent ten years photographing the DC Go-Go scene and was one of Chuck Brown's photographers for the archival and documented history of go-go. On February 14, 2022, the book DC Go-Go: Ten Years Backstage by photographer Chip Py was published by The History Press. The 208-page book features 251 of Py's photographs of all the bands, legends and fans shot at the go-go as well as nine chapters about the origins, the culture, the legends, the bands, the culture, #dontmutedc and how Go-Go became the official music of Washington, D.C. In 2024 the Go-Go Museum and Cafe was opened, in Anacostia, Washington, D.C. Modern artists like Charles "Shorty Corleone" Garris continue the go-go tradition in D.C.

Gogo’s sound has also continued to advance with bands and artists fusing the sound into their own styles. Tone P, Drew Keys, Eddie Beat, Chop on da Beat, and Carter Beat are a few that have all made their own versions of an electronic style of gogo similar to what Wale used in his career. There has also been an emergence of rock fused gogo played by bands such as Black Alley, Tone P’s Band Tha Carry Out, Breezy Supreme, and HUE.

== See also ==
- Music of Washington, D.C.
- Maxx Kidd
- New Jack Swing
- Teddy Riley
- Go-Go Crankin', a 1985 compilation album
- Go Go Live at the Capital Centre, a 1987 go-go concert
- Straight Up Go-Go, a 1992 documentary film
- The Beat: Go-Go's Fusion of Funk and Hip-Hop, a 2001 compilation album
